Maximilian I (22 March 1459 – 12 January 1519) was King of the Romans from 1486 and Holy Roman Emperor from 1508 until his death. He was never crowned by the Pope, as the journey to Rome was blocked by the Venetians. He proclaimed himself elected emperor in 1508  (Pope Julius II later recognized this) at Trent, thus breaking the long tradition of requiring a papal coronation for the adoption of the Imperial title. Maximilian was the only surviving son of Frederick III, Holy Roman Emperor, and Eleanor of Portugal. Since his coronation as King of the Romans in 1486, he ran a double government, or Doppelregierung (with a separate court), with his father until Frederick's death in 1493.

Maximilian expanded the influence of the House of Habsburg through war and his marriage in 1477 to Mary of Burgundy, the ruler of the Burgundian State, heir of Charles the Bold, though he also lost his family's original lands in today's Switzerland to the Swiss Confederacy. Through the marriage of his son Philip the Handsome to eventual queen Joanna of Castile in 1496, Maximilian helped to establish the Habsburg dynasty in Spain, which allowed his grandson Charles to hold the thrones of both Castile and Aragon. The historian Thomas A. Brady Jr. describes him as "the first Holy Roman Emperor in 250 years who ruled as well as reigned" and also, the "ablest royal warlord of his generation."

Nicknamed "Coeur d’acier" ("Heart of steel") by Olivier de la Marche and later historians (either as praise for his courage and martial qualities or reproach for his ruthlessness as a warlike ruler), Maximilian has entered the public consciousness as "the last knight" (der letzte Ritter), especially since the eponymous poem by Anastasius Grün was published (although the nickname likely existed even in Maximilian's lifetime). Scholarly debates still discuss whether he was truly the last knight (either as an idealized medieval ruler leading people on horseback, or a Don Quixote-type dreamer and misadventurer), or the first Renaissance prince – an amoral Machiavellian politician who carried his family "to the European pinnacle of dynastic power" largely on the back of loans. Historians of the second half of the nineteenth century like Leopold von Ranke tended to criticize Maximilian for putting the interest of his dynasty above that of Germany, hampering the nation's unification process. Ever since Hermann Wiesflecker's Kaiser Maximilian I. Das Reich, Österreich und Europa an der Wende zur Neuzeit (1971–1986) became the standard work, a much more positive image of the emperor has emerged. He is seen as an essentially modern, innovative ruler who carried out important reforms and promoted significant cultural achievements, even if the financial price weighed hard on the Austrians and his military expansion caused the deaths and sufferings of tens of thousands of people.

Through an "unprecedented" image-building program, with the help of many notable scholars and artists, in his lifetime, the emperor – "the promoter, coordinator, and prime mover, an artistic impresario and entrepreneur with seemingly limitless energy and enthusiasm and an unfailing eye for detail" – had built for himself "a virtual royal self" of a quality that historians call "unmatched" or "hitherto unimagined". To this image, new layers have been added by the works of later artists in the centuries following his death, both as continuation of deliberately crafted images developed by his program as well as development of spontaneous sources and exploration of actual historical events, creating what Elaine Tennant dubs the "Maximilian industry".

Background and childhood

Maximilian was born at Wiener Neustadt on 22 March 1459. His father, Frederick III, Holy Roman Emperor, named him for an obscure saint, Maximilian of Tebessa, who Frederick believed had once warned him of imminent peril in a dream. In his infancy, he and his parents were besieged in Vienna by Albert of Austria. One source relates that, during the siege's bleakest days, the young prince wandered about the castle garrison, begging the servants and men-at-arms for bits of bread. He was the favourite child of his mother, whose personality was a contrast to his father (although there seemed to be communication problems between mother and son, as she spoke Portuguese). Reportedly she told Maximilian that, "If I had known, my son, that you would become like your father, I would have regretted having born you for the throne." Her early death pushed him even more towards a man's world, where one grew up first as a warrior rather than a politician.

Despite the efforts of his father Frederick and his tutor Peter Engelbrecht (whom Maximilian held in contempt all his life because of his violent teaching methods which, according to Cuspinianus, only made Maximilian hate science), Maximilian became an indifferent, at times belligerent student, who much preferred physical activities than learning (he would later rediscover the love of science and culture on his own terms though, especially during his time in Burgundy, under the influence of Mary of Burgundy). Although the two remained on good terms overall and the emperor encouraged Maximilian's interest in weapons and the hunt, as well as let him attend important meetings, Frederick was horrified by his only surviving son and heir's overzealousness in chivalric contests, extravagance, and especially a heavy tendency towards wine, feasts and young women, which became evident during their trips in 1473–74. Even though he was still very young, the prince's skills and physical attractiveness made him the center everywhere he went. Although Frederick had forbidden the princes of the Empire from fighting with Maximilian in tournaments, Maximilian gave himself the necessary permission at the first chance he got. Frederick did not allow him to participate in the 1474 war against Burgundy though and placed him under the care of the Bishop of Augsburg instead.

The Duke of Burgundy, Charles the Bold, was the chief political opponent of Maximilian's father Frederick III. Frederick was concerned about Burgundy's expansionist tendencies on the western border of his Holy Roman Empire, and, to forestall military conflict, he attempted to secure the marriage of Charles' only daughter, Mary of Burgundy, to his son Maximilian. After the Siege of Neuss (1474–75), he was successful.

Perhaps as preparation for his task in the Netherlands, in 1476, at the age of 17, in the name of his father, apparently Maximilian commanded a military campaign against Hungary – the first actual battlefield experience in his life (command responsibility was likely shared with more experienced generals though).

The wedding between Maximilian and Mary took place on 19 August 1477.

Reign in Burgundy and the Netherlands

Maximilian's wife had inherited the large Burgundian domains in France and the Low Countries upon her father's death in the Battle of Nancy on 5 January 1477.

The Duchy of Burgundy was also claimed by the French crown under Salic law, with Louis XI of France vigorously asserting his claim through military force. Maximilian at once undertook the defence of his wife's dominions. Without support from the Empire and with an empty treasury left by Charles the Bold's campaigns (Mary had to pawn her jewels to obtain loans), he carried out a campaign against the French during 1478–1479 and reconquered Le Quesnoy, Conde and Antoing. He defeated the French forces at the Battle of Guinegate, in modern Enguinegatte, on 7 August 1479. Despite winning, Maximilian had to abandon the siege of Thérouanne and disband his army, either because the Netherlanders did not want him to become too strong or because his treasury was empty. The battle was an important mark in military history though: the Burgundian pikemen were the precursors of the Landsknechte, while the French side derived the momentum for military reform from their loss.

According to some, Maximilian and Mary's wedding contract stipulated that their children would succeed them but that the couple could not be each other's heirs. Mary tried to bypass this rule with a promise to transfer territories as a gift in case of her death, but her plans were confounded. After Mary's death in a riding accident on 27 March 1482 near the Wijnendale Castle, Maximilian's aim was now to secure the inheritance to his and Mary's son, Philip the Handsome. According to Haemers and Sutch, the original marriage contract stipulated that Maximilian could not inherit her Burgundian lands if they had children.

The Guinegate victory made Maximilian popular, but as an inexperienced ruler, he hurt himself politically by trying to centralize authority without respecting traditional rights and consulting relevant political bodies. The Belgian historian Eugène Duchesne comments that these years were among the saddest and most turbulent in the history of the country, and despite his later great imperial career, Maximilian unfortunately could never compensate for the mistakes he made as regent in this period. Some of the Netherlander provinces were hostile to Maximilian, and, in 1482, they signed a treaty with Louis XI in Arras that forced Maximilian to give up Franche-Comté and Artois to the French crown. They openly rebelled twice in the period 1482–1492, attempting to regain the autonomy they had enjoyed under Mary. Flemish rebels managed to capture Philip and even Maximilian himself, but they released Maximilian when Frederick III intervened. In 1489, as he turned his attention to his hereditary lands, he left the Low Countries in the hands of Albert of Saxony, who proved to be an excellent choice, as he was less emotionally committed to the Low Countries and more flexible as a politician than Maximilian, while also being a capable general. By 1492, rebellions were completely suppressed.  Maximilian revoked the Great Privilege and established a strong ducal monarchy undisturbed by particularism. But he would not reintroduce Charles the Bold's centralizing ordinances. Since 1489 (after his departure), the government under Albert of Saxony had made more efforts in consulting representative institutions and showed more restraint in subjugating recalcitrant territories. Notables who had previously supported rebellions returned to city administrations. The Estates General continued to develop as a regular meeting place of the central government. The harsh suppression of the rebellions did have an unifying effect, in that provinces stopped behaving like separate entities each supporting a different lord. Helmut Koenigsberger opines that it was not the erratic leadership of Maximilian, who was brave but hardly understood the Netherlands, but the Estates' desire for the survival of the country that made the Burgundian monarchy survive. Jean Berenger and C.A. Simpson argue that Maximilian, as a gifted military champion and organizer, did save the Netherlands from France, although the conflict between the Estates and his personal ambitions caused a catastrophic situation in the short term. Peter Spufford opines that the invasion was prevented by a combination of the Estates and Maximilian, although the cost of war, Maximilian's spendthrift liberality and the interests enforced by his German bankers did cause huge expenditure while income was falling. Jelle Haemers comments that the Estates stopped their support towards the young and ambitious impresario (director) of war (who took personal control of both the military and financial details during the war) because they knew that after Guinegate, the nature of the war was not defensive anymore. Maximilian and his followers had managed to achieve remarkable success in stabilizing the situation though, and a stalemate was kept in Ghent as well as in Bruges, before the tragic death of Mary in 1482 completely turned the political landscape in the whole country upside down. According to Haemers, while Willem Zoete's indictment of Maximilian's government was a one-sided picture that exaggerated the negative points and the Regency Council displayed many of the same problems, Maximilian and his followers could have been more prudent when dealing with the complaints of their opponents before matters became bigger.

During his time in the Low Countries, he had experimented with all kinds of military models available, first urban militia and vassalic troops, then French-style companies that were too rigid and costly, and finally Germanic mercenaries (when Albert of Saxony came to the scene, these became their main force). The brutal efficiency of Germanic mercenaries, together with the financial support of cities outside Flanders like Antwerp, Amsterdam, Mechelen and Brussels as well as a small group of loyal landed nobles proved decisive in the Burgundian-Habsburg regime's final triumph. Reviewing the French historian Amable Sablon du Corail's La Guerre, le prince et ses sujets. Les finances des Pays-Bas bourguignons sous Marie de Bourgogne et Maximilien d’Autriche (1477–1493), Marc Boone comments that the brutality described shows Maximilian and the Habsburg dynasty's insatiable greed of expansion and inability to adapt to local traditions, while Jean-François Lassalmonie opines that the nation building process (successful, with the establishment of a common tax) was remarkably similar to the same process in France, including the hesitation in working with local levels of the political society, except that the struggle was shorter and after 1494 a peaceful dialogue between the prince and the estates was reached. Jelle Haemers opines that the level of violence associated with the suppression of the revolts as traditionally imagined has been exaggerated and that most of the violence happened in a symbolical manner, but also cautions against the tendency to consider the "central state" in the sense of a modern state.

While it has been suggested that Maximilian displayed a class-based mentality that favoured the aristocrats (a modern historian who shares this viewpoint is Koenigsberger), recent studies suggest that, as evidenced by the court ordinance of 1482 (at this point, before Mary's death, threats to his rule seemed to have been eliminated) among others, he sought to promote "parvenus" who were beholden to himself (often either functionaries who had risen under Charles the Bold and then proved loyalty to Maximilian, or representatives of the mercantile elites), and at an alarming speed for the traditional elites. After the rebellions, concerning the aristocracy, although Maximilian punished few with death (unlike what he himself later described in Theuerdank), their properties were largely confiscated and they were replaced with a new elite class loyal to the Habsburgs – among whom, there were noblemen who had been part of traditional high nobility but elevated to supranational importance only in this period. The most important of these were John III and Frederik of Egmont, Engelbrecht II of Nassau, Henry of Witthem and the brothers of Glymes–Bergen.

In early 1486, he retook Mortaigne, l'Ecluse, Honnecourt and even Thérouanne, but the same thing like in 1479 happened – he lacked financial resources to exploit and keep his gains. Only in 1492, with a stable internal situation, he was able to reconquer and keep Franche-Comté and Arras on the pretext that the French had repudiated his daughter. In 1493, Maximilian and Charles VIII of France signed the Treaty of Senlis, with which Artois and Franche-Comté returned to Burgundian rule while Picardy was confirmed as French possession. The French also continued to keep the Duchy of Burgundy. Thus a large part of the Netherlands (known as the Seventeen Provinces) stayed in the Habsburg patrimony.

On 8 January 1488, using a similar 1373 French ordinance as the model, together with Philip, he issued the Ordinance of Admiralty, that organized the Admiralty as a state institution and strove to centralize maritime authority (this was a departure from the policy of Philip the Good, whose 1458 ordinance tried to restore maritime order by decentralizing power). This was the beginning of the Dutch navy, although initially the policy faced opposition and unfavourable political climate, which only improved with the appointment of Philip of Burgundy-Beveren in 1491. A permanent navy only took shape after 1555 under the governorship of his granddaughter Mary of Hungary.

In 1493, Frederick III died, thus Maximilian I became de facto leader of the Holy Roman Empire. He decided to transfer power to the 15-year-old Philip. During the time in the Low Countries, he contracted such emotional problems that except for rare, necessary occasions, he would never return to the land again after gaining control. When the Estates sent a delegation to offer him the regency after Philip's death in 1506, he evaded them for months.

As suzerain, Maximilian continued to involve himself with the Low Countries from afar. His son's and daughter's governments tried to maintain a compromise between the states and the Empire. Philip, in particular, sought to maintain an independent Burgundian policy, which sometimes caused disagreements with his father. As Philip preferred to maintain peace and economic development for his land, Maximilian was left fighting Charles of Egmond over Guelders on his own resources. At one point, Philip let French troops supporting Guelders's resistance to his rule pass through his own land. Only at the end of his reign, Philip decided to deal with this threat together with his father. By this time, Guelders had been affected by the continuous state of war and other problems. The duke of Cleves and the bishop of Utrecht, hoping to share spoils, gave Philip aid. Maximilian invested his own son with Guelders and Zutphen. Within months and with his father's skilled use of field artillery, Philip conquered the whole land and Charles of Egmond was forced to prostrate himself in front of Philip. Maximilian would like to see the Guelders matter to be dealt with once and for all, but as Charles later escaped and Philip was at haste to make his 1506 fatal journey to Spain, troubles would soon arise again, leaving Margaret to deal with the problems. Maximilian was exasperated by the attitude of Philip (whom, in Maximilian's imagination, was probably influenced by insidious French agency) and the Estates, whom he considered to be unbelievably nonchalant and tightfisted about a threat to their own country's security. Philip's death in Burgos was a heavy blow personally (Maximilian's entourage seemed to have concealed the incident from him for more than ten days) and also politically, as by this time, he had become his father's most important international ally, although he retained his independent judgement. All their joint ventures fell apart, including the planned Italian expedition in 1508.

The Estates preferred to maintain peace with France and Guelders. But Charles of Egmont, the de facto lord of Guelders continued to cause trouble. In 1511, Margaret made an alliance with England and besieged Venlo, but Charles of Egmont invaded Holland so the siege had to be lifted. James D. Tracy opines that Maximilian and Margaret were reasonable in demanding more stern measures against Guelders, but their critics in the Estates General (that had continuously voted against providing funds for wars against Guelders) and among the nobles naively thought that Charles of Egmont could be controlled by maintaining the peaceful relationship with the King of France, his patron. Leading Humanists in the Netherlands like Erasmus and Hadrianus Barlandus displayed a distrust towards the government and especially the person of Maximilian, whom they believed to be a warlike and greedy prince. After the brutal 1517 campaign of Charles of Egmont in Friesland and Holland, these Humanists, in their mistaken belief, spread the stories that the emperor and other princes were concocting clever schemes and creating wars just to expand the Habsburg dominion and extracting money.

By the time Margaret became Regent, Maximilian was less inclined to help regarding the Guelders matter. He suggested to her that the Estates in the Low Countries should defend themselves, forcing her to sign the 1513 treaty with Charles. Habsburg Netherlands would only be able to incorporate Guelders and Zutphen under Charles V.

Following Margaret's strategy of defending the Low Countries with foreign armies, in 1513, at the head of Henry VIII's army, Maximilian gained a victory against the French at the Battle of the Spurs, at little cost to himself or his daughter (in fact according to Margaret, the Low Countries got a profit of one million of gold from supplying the English army). For the sake of his grandson Charles's Burgundian lands, he ordered Thérouanne's walls to be demolished (the stronghold had often served as a backdoor for French interference in the Low Countries).

Reign in the Holy Roman Empire

Recapture of Austria and expedition to Hungary

Maximilian was elected King of the Romans on 16 February 1486 in Frankfurt-am-Main at his father's initiative and crowned on 9 April 1486 in Aachen. Much of the Austrian territories and Vienna were under the rule of King Matthias Corvinus of Hungary, as a result of the Austrian–Hungarian War (1477–1488). Maximilian was now a king without lands. Matthias Corvinus offered Emperor Frederick and his son prince Maximilian, the return of Austrian provinces and Vienna, if they would renounce the treaty of 1463 and accept Matthias as Frederick's designated heir and favoured successor as Holy Roman Emperor. Before this was settled though, Matthias died in Vienna in 1490. However, after Matthias Corvinus died from a stroke on 6 April 1490, civil war broke out in Hungary between the supporters of John Corvinus and the supporters of king Vladislaus of Bohemia. Due to the Hungarian civil war, new possibilities were opened for Maximilan. From July 1490, Maximilian began a series of short sieges that reconquered cities and fortresses that his father had lost in Austria. Maximilian entered Vienna without siege, already evacuated by the Hungarians, in August 1490. He was injured while attacking the citadel guarded by a garrison of 400 Hungarians troops who twice repelled his forces, but after some days they surrendered. With money from Innsbruck and southern German towns, he raised enough cavalry and Landsknechte to campaign into Hungary itself. Despite Hungary's lower nobility, the gentry's hostility to the Habsburg, he managed to gain many supporters from higher aristocracy, including several of Corvinus's former supporters. One of them, Jakob Székely, handed over the Styrian castles to him. He claimed his status as King of Hungary, demanding allegiance through Stephen of Moldavia. In seven weeks, they conquered a quarter of Hungary. His mercenaries committed the atrocity of totally sacking Székesfehérvár, the country's main fortress. When encountering the frost, the troops refused to continue the war though, requesting Maximilian to double their pay, which he could not afford. The revolt turned the situation in favour of the Jagiellonian forces.  Maximilian was forced to return. He depended on his father and the territorial estates for financial support. Soon he reconquered Lower and Inner Austria for his father, who returned and settled at Linz. Worrying about his son's adventurous tendencies, Frederick decided to starve him financially though.

Beatrice of Naples (1457–1508), Mathias Corvinus's widow, initially supported Maximilian out of hope that he would marry her, but Maximilian did not want this liaison. The Hungarian magnates found Maximilian impressive, but they wanted a king they could dominate. The crown of Hungary thus fell to King Vladislaus II, who was deemed weaker in personality and also agreed to marry Beatrice. Tamás Bakócz, the Hungarian chancellor allied himself with Maximilian and helped him to circumvent the 1505 Diet which declared that no foreigner could be elected as King of Hungary. In 1491, they signed the peace treaty of Pressburg, which provided that Maximilian recognized Vladislaus as King of Hungary, but the Habsburgs would inherit the throne on the extinction of Vladislaus's male line and the Austrian side also received 100,000 golden florins as war reparations. It was with Maximilian that the Croatians began to harbour a connection to the House of Habsburg. Except the two most powerful noblemen (Duke Ivanis Corvinus and Bernardin Frankopan), the Croatian nobility wanted him as King. Worrying that a protracted, multi-fronted war would leave him overextended though, Maximilian evacuated from Croatia (he had conquered the whole northern part of the country previously) and accepted the treaty with the Jagiellons.

In addition, the County of Tyrol and Duchy of Bavaria went to war in the late 15th century. Bavaria demanded money from Tyrol that had been loaned on the collateral of Tyrolean lands. In 1490, the two states demanded that Maximilian I step in to mediate the dispute. His Habsburg cousin, the childless Archduke Sigismund, was negotiating to sell Tyrol to their Wittelsbach rivals rather than let Emperor Frederick inherit it. Maximilian's charm and tact though led to a reconciliation and a reunited dynastic rule in the 1490.  Because Tyrol had no law code at this time, the nobility freely expropriated money from the populace, which caused the court in Innsbruck to fester with corruption. After taking control, Maximilian instituted immediate financial reform. Gaining control of Tyrol for the Habsburgs was of strategic importance because it linked the Swiss Confederacy to the Habsburg-controlled Austrian lands, which facilitated some imperial geographic continuity.

Maximilian became ruler of the Holy Roman Empire upon the death of his father in 1493.

Italian and Swiss wars

As the Treaty of Senlis had resolved French differences with the Holy Roman Empire, King Louis XII of France had secured borders in the north and turned his attention to Italy, where he made claims for the Duchy of Milan. In 1499–1500 he conquered it and drove the Sforza regent Lodovico il Moro into exile. This brought him into a potential conflict with Maximilian, who on 16 March 1494 had married Bianca Maria Sforza, a daughter of Galeazzo Maria Sforza, duke of Milan. However, Maximilian was unable to hinder the French from taking over Milan. The prolonged Italian Wars resulted in Maximilian joining the Holy League to counter the French. His campaigns in Italy generally were not successful, and his progress there was quickly checked. Maximilian's Italian campaigns tend to be criticized for being wasteful and gaining him little. Despite the emperor's work in enhancing his army technically and organization-wise, due to financial difficulties, the forces he could muster were always too small to make a decisive difference. In Italy, he gained the derisive nickname of "Massimiliano di pochi denari" (Maximilian the Moneyless). One particularly humiliating episode happened in 1508, with a force mustered largely from hereditary lands and with limited resources, the emperor decided to attack Venice. The diversionary force under Sixt Trautson were routed by Bartolomeo d'Alviano (Sixt Trautson himself was among the fallen), while Maximilian's own advance was blocked by the main Venetian force under Niccolò di Pitigliano and a French army under Alessandro Trivulzio. Bartolomeo d'Alviano then pushed into the Imperial territory, seizing Gorizia and Trieste, forcing Maximilian to sign a very unfavourable truce. Afterwards, he formed the League of Cambrai together with Spain, France and Pope Julius II and won back the territories he had conceded and some Venetian possessions. Most of the Slovene-inhabited areas were transferred to the Habsburgs. But atrocities and expenses for war devastated Austria and Carniola. Lack of financial means meant that he depended on allies' resources, and just like in the Low Countries, he sometimes practically functioned as the condottiero. When Schiner suggested that they should let war feed war though, he did not agree or was not brutal enough to do that. He acknowledged French control of Milan in 1515.

The situation in Italy was not the only problem Maximilian had at the time. The Swiss won a decisive victory against the Empire in the Battle of Dornach on 22 July 1499. Maximilian had no choice but to agree to a peace treaty signed on 22 September 1499 in Basel that granted the Swiss Confederacy independence from the Holy Roman Empire.

Jewish and Romani policies

Jewish policy under Maximilian fluctuated greatly, usually influenced by financial considerations and the emperor's vacillating attitude when facing opposing views. In 1496, Maximilian issued a decree which expelled all Jews from Styria and Wiener Neustadt. Between 1494 and 1510, he authorized no less than thirteen expulsions of Jews in return of sizeable fiscal compensations from local government (The expelled Jews were allowed to resettle in Lower Austria. Buttaroni comments that this inconsistency showed that even Maximilian himself did not believe his expulsion decision was just.). After 1510 though, this happened only once, and he showed an unusually resolute attitude in resisting a campaign to expel Jews from Regensburg. David Price comments that during the first seventeen years of his reign, he was a great threat to the Jews, but after 1510, even if his attitude was still exploitative, his policy gradually changed. A factor that probably played a role in the change was Maximilian's success in expanding imperial taxing over German Jewry: at this point, he probably considered the possibility of generating tax money from stable Jewish communities, instead of temporary financial compensations from local jurisdictions who sought to expel Jews. Noflatscher and Péterfi note that Maximilian had a deep dislike for Jews since childhood, the reason of which is unknown, since both of his parents greatly favoured the Jews.

In 1509, relying on the influence of Kunigunde, Maximilian's pious sister and the Cologne Dominicans, the anti-Jewish agitator Johannes Pfefferkorn was authorized by Maximilian to confiscate all offending Jewish books (including prayer books), except the Bible. The confiscations happened in Frankfurt, Bingen, Mainz and other German cities. Responding to the order, the archbishop of Mainz, the city council of Frankfurt and various German princes tried to intervene in defense of the Jews. Maximilian consequently ordered the confiscated books to be returned. On 23 May 1510 though, influenced by a supposed "host desecration" and blood libel in Brandenburg, as well as pressure from Kunigunde, he ordered the creation of an investigating commission and asked for expert opinions from German universities and scholars. The prominent humanist Johann Reuchlin argued strongly in defense of the Jewish books, especially the Talmud. Reuchlin's arguments seemed to leave an impression on the emperor (who followed his advice, against the recommendation of his own commission), who gradually developed an intellectual interest in the Talmud and other Jewish books. Maximilian later urged the Hebraist Petrus Galatinus to defend Reuchlin's position. Galatinus dedicated his work De Arcanis Catholicae Veritatis, which provided 'a literary "threshold" where Jews and gentiles might meet', to the emperor. It was Maximilian's support that enabled Reuchlin to fully devote himself to Jewish literature. Like his father Frederick III and his grandson Ferdinand I, he held Jewish physicians and teachers in high esteem. In 1514, he appointed Paulus Ricius, a Jew who converted to Christianity, as his personal physician. He was more interested in Ricius's Hebrew skills than in his medical abilities though. In 1515, he reminded his treasurer Jakob Villinger that Ricius was admitted for the purpose of translating the Talmud into Latin, and urged Villinger to keep an eye on him. Perhaps overwhelmed by the emperor's request, Ricius only managed to translate two out of sixty-three Mishna tractates before the emperor's death. Ricius managed to publish a translation of Joseph Gikatilla's Kabbalistic work The Gates of Light, which was dedicated to Maximilian, though. It was under Frederick and Maximilian that the foundation of Modern Judaism arose, steeped in Humanism.

It was under Maximilian that policies concerning the Romani became harsher. In 1500, a notice was given to the Romani that they had to leave Germany by the next Easter, or become outlaws (the Romani had to evade the law by following a constant circuit from an area to another, and at times, obtain patronage from aristocrats). The reformation beginning in 1517 did not consider them foreigners anymore, but as local beggars, they also faced discrimination. The change in policy was seemingly linked to the fear of the Turks (the Romani were accused of being spies for the Turks). Kenrich and Puxon explains that connect the situation with the consolidation of European nation-states, that also stimulated similar policies elsewhere.

Reforms

Within the Holy Roman Empire, there was also a consensus that deep reforms were needed to preserve the unity of the Empire. For most of his reign, Frederick III had considered reform as a threat to his imperial prerogatives and wanted to avoid direct confrontations with the princes on the matter. However, in his last years, mainly to secure election for Maximilian, he presided over the initial phase of reform. Maximilian though was more open to reform. From 1488 through his reign as sole ruler, he practiced a policy of brokerage, acting as the impartial judge between options suggested by the princes. Many measures were launched in the 1495 Reichstag at Worms. A new organ was introduced, the Reichskammergericht, that was to be largely independent from the Emperor. A new tax was launched to finance the Empire's affairs (above all military campaigns), the Gemeine Pfennig. It was levied for the first time between 1495 and 1499, raising 136,000 florins, and another five times  during the 1512–1551 period, before being supplanted by the matricular system which allowed common burdens to be assessed at imperial as well as Kreis level. To create a rival for the Reichskammergericht, Maximilian establish the Reichshofrat, which had its seat in Vienna. Unlike the Reichskammergericht, the Reichshofrat looked into criminal matters and even allowed the emperors the means to depose rulers who did not live up to expectations. Pavlac and Lott note that, during Maximilian's reign, this council was not popular though. According to Barbara Stollberg-Rilinger though, throughout the early modern period, the Reichshofrat remained by far the faster and more efficient among the two Courts. The Reichskammergericht on the other hand was often torn by matters related to confessional alliance. Around 1497–1498, as part of his administrative reforms, he restructured his Privy Council (Geheimer Rat), a decision which today induces much scholarly discussion. Apart from balancing the Reichskammergericht with the Reichshofrat, this act of restructuring seemed to suggest that, as Westphal quoting Ortlieb, the "imperial ruler – independent of the existence of a supreme court – remained the contact person for hard pressed subjects in legal disputes as well, so that a special agency to deal with these matters could appear sensible" (as also shown by the large number of supplications he received).

In 1500, as Maximilian urgently needed assistance for his military plans, he agreed to establish an organ called the Reichsregiment (central imperial government, consisting of twenty members including the Electors, with the Emperor or his representative as its chairman), first organized in 1501 in Nuremberg and consisted of the deputies of the Emperor, local rulers, commoners, and the prince-electors of the Holy Roman Empire. Maximilian resented the new organization as it weakened his powers, and the Estates failed to support it. The new organ proved politically weak, and its power returned to Maximilian in 1502.

According to Thomas Brady Jr. and Jan-Dirk Müller, the most important governmental changes targeted the heart of the regime: the chancery. Early in Maximilian's reign, the Court Chancery at Innsbruck competed with the Imperial Chancery (which was under the elector-archbishop of Mainz, the senior Imperial chancellor). By referring the political matters in Tyrol, Austria as well as Imperial problems to the Court Chancery, Maximilian gradually centralized its authority. The two chanceries became combined in 1502. Jan-Dirk Müller opines that this chancery became the decisive government institution since 1502. In 1496, the emperor created a general treasury (Hofkammer) in Innsbruck, which became responsible for all the hereditary lands. The chamber of accounts (Raitkammer) at Vienna was made subordinate to this body. Under Paul von Liechtenstein, the Hofkammer was entrusted with not only hereditary lands' affairs, but Maximilian's affairs as the German king too.

Historian Joachim Whaley points out that there are usually two opposite views on Maximilian's rulership: one side is represented by the works of nineteenth century historians like Heinrich Ullmann or Leopold von Ranke, which criticize him for selfishly exploiting the German nation and putting the interest of his dynasty over his Germanic nation, thus impeding the unification process; the more recent side is represented by Hermann Wiesflecker's biography of 1971–86, which praises him for being "a talented and successful ruler, notable not only for his Realpolitik but also for his cultural activities generally and for his literary and artistic patronage in particular".

According to Brady Jr., Ranke is right regarding the fact Berthold von Henneberg and other princes did play the leading role in presenting the proposals for creating institutions (that would also place the power in the hands of the princes) in 1495. However, what Maximilian opposed was not reform per se. He generally shared their sentiments regarding ending feuds, sounder administrative procedures, better record-keeping, qualifications for offices etc. Responding to the proposal that an Imperial Council (the later Reichsregiment) should be created, he agreed and welcomed the participation of the Estates, but he alone should be the one who appointed members and the council should function only  during his campaigns. He supported modernizing reforms (which he himself pioneered in his Austrian lands), but also wanted to tie it to his personal control, above all by permanent taxation, which the Estates consistently opposed. In 1504, when he was strong enough to propose his own ideas of such a Council, the cowered Estates tried to resist. At his strongest point though, he still failed to find a solution for the common tax matter, which led to disasters in Italy later. Stollberg-Rilinger notes that had the Common Penny been successful, modern governmental structures would likely emerge on the Empire's level, but that was why it failed as it was not in the interest of territorial lords. Meanwhile, he explored Austria's potential as a base for Imperial power and built his government largely with officials drawn from the lower aristocracy and burghers in Southern Germany. Whaley notes that the real foundation of his Imperial power lay with his networks of allies and clients, especially the less powerful Estates, who helped him to recover his strength in 1502 – his first reform proposals as King of the Romans in 1486 were about the creation of a network of regional unions. According to Whaley, "More systematically than any predecessor, Maximilian exploited the potential of regional leagues and unions to extend imperial influence and to create the possibility of imperial government in the Reich." To the Empire, the mechanisms involving such regional institutions bolstered the Land Piece (Ewiger Landfriede) declared in 1495 as well as the creation of the Reichskreise (Imperial Circles, which would serve the purpose of organize imperial armies, collect taxes and enforce orders of the imperial institutions: there were six at first; in 1512, the number increased to ten), between 1500 and 1512, although they were only fully functional some decades later. While Brady describes Maximilian's thinking as "dynastic and early modern", Heinz Angermeier (also focusing on his intentions at the 1495 Diet) writes that for Maximilian, "the first politician on the German throne", dynastic interests and imperial politics had no contradiction. Rather, the alliance with Spain, imperial prerogatives, anti-Ottoman agenda, European leadership and inner politics were all tied together. In Austria, Maximilian defined two administrative units: Lower Austria and Upper Austria (Further Austria was included in Upper Austria).

Another development arising from the reform was that, amidst the prolonged struggles between the monarchical-centralism of the emperor and the estates-based federalism of the princes, the Reichstag (Imperial Diet) became the all-important political forum and the supreme legal and constitutional institution (without any declared legal basis or inaugural act), which would act as a guarantee for the preservation of the Empire in the long run.

Ultimately, the results of the reform movement presided over by Maximilian, as presented in the shape of newly formed structures as well as the general framework (functioning as a constitutional framework), were a compromise between emperor and estates, who more or less shared common cause but separate interests. Although the system of institutions arose from this were not complete, a flexible, adaptive problem-solving mechanism for the Empire was formed. Stollberg also links the development of the reform to the concentration of supranational power in the Habsburgs' hand, which manifested in the successful dynastic marriages of Maximilian and his descendants (and the successful defense of those lands, notably the rich Low Countries) as well as Maximilian's development of a revolutionary post system that helped the Habsburgs to maintain control of their territories (Additionally, the communication revolution created by the combination of the postal system with printing would boost the empire's capability of disseminating orders and policies as well as its coherence in general, elevating cultural life, and also help reformers like Luther to broadcast their views effectively.).

Recent German research explores the importance of the Reichstags that followed the 1495 one in Worms. The 1512 Reichstag in Trier that Maximilian assembled, for example, was decisive for the development of the Reichskammergericht, the Land Peace and the Gemeine Pfennig, although by this point it was clear that Maximilian was already past his best years (the early signs of crisis seemed to have showed already in Cologne, 1505)  – which, according to Dietmar Heil, resulted in the fact that the Gemeine Pfennig was only partially approved and then partially implemented.

According to Whaley, if Maximilian ever saw Germany as a source of income and soldiers only, he failed miserably in extracting both. His hereditary lands and other sources always contributed much more (the Estates gave him the equivalent of 50,000 gulden per year, a lower than even the taxes paid by Jews in both the Reich and hereditary lands, while Austria contributed 500,000 to 1,000,000 gulden per year). On the other hand, the attempts he demonstrated in building the imperial system alone shows that he did consider the German lands "a real sphere of government in which aspirations to royal rule were actively and purposefully pursued." Whaley notes that, despite struggles, what emerged at the end of Maximilian's rule was a strengthened monarchy and not an oligarchy of princes. If he was usually weak when trying to act as a monarch and using imperial instituations like the Reichstag, Maximilian's position was often strong when acting as a neutral overlord and relying on regional leagues of weaker principalities such as the Swabian league, as shown in his ability to call on money and soldiers to mediate the Bavaria dispute in 1504, after which he gained significant territories in Alsace, Swabia and Tyrol. His fiscal reform in his hereditary lands provided a model for other German princes. Benjamin Curtis opines that while Maximilian was not able to fully create a common government for his lands (although the chancellery and court council were able to coordinate affairs across the realms), he strengthened key administrative functions in Austria and created central offices to deal with financial, political and judicial matters – these offices replaced the feudal system and became representative of a more modern system that was administered by professionalized officials. After two decades of reforms, the emperor retained his position as first among equals, while the empire gained common institutions through which the emperor shared power with the estates.

In 1508, Maximilian, with the assent of Pope Julius II, took the title Erwählter Römischer Kaiser ("Elected Roman Emperor"), thus ending the centuries-old custom that the Holy Roman Emperor had to be crowned by the Pope.

At the 1495 Diet of Worms, the Reception of Roman Law was accelerated and formalized. The Roman Law was made binding in German courts, except in the case it was contrary to local statutes. In practice, it became the basic law throughout Germany, displacing Germanic local law to a large extent, although Germanic law was still operative at the lower courts. Other than the desire to achieve legal unity and other factors, the adoption also highlighted the continuity between the Ancient Roman empire and the Holy Roman Empire. To realize his resolve to reform and unify the legal system, the emperor frequently intervened personally in matters of local legal matters, overriding local charters and customs. This practice was often met with irony and scorn from local councils, who wanted to protect local codes. Maximilian had a general reputation of justice and clemency, but could occasionally act in a violent and resentful manner if personally affronted.

In 1499, as the ruler of Tyrol, he introduced the Maximilianische Halsgerichtsordnung (the Penal Code of Maximilian). This was the first codified penal law in the German speaking world. The law attempted to introduce regularity into contemporary discrete practices of the courts. This would be part of the basis for the Constitutio Criminalis Carolina established under Charles V in 1530. Regarding the use of torture, the court needed to decide whether someone should be tortured. If such a decision was made, three council members and a clerk should be present and observe whether a confession was made only because of the fear of torture or the pain of torture, or that another person would be harmed.

During the Austrian-Hungarian war (1477–1488), Maximilian's father Frederick III issued the first modern regulations to strengthen military discipline. In 1508, using this ordinance as the basis, Maximilian devised the first military code  ("Articles"). This code included 23 articles. The first five articles prescribed total obedience to imperial authority. Article 7 established the rules of conduct in camps. Article 13 exempted churches from billeting while Article 14 forbade violence against civilians: "You shall swear that you will not harm any pregnant women, widows and orphans, priests, honest maidens and mothers, under the fear of punishment for perjury and death". These actions that indicated the early developments of a "military revolution" in European laws had a tradition in the Roman concept of a just war and ideas of sixteenth-century scholars, who developed this ancient doctrine with a main thesis which advocated that war was a matter between two armies and thus the civilians (especially women, children and old people) should be given immunity. The code would be the basis for further ordinances by Charles V and new "Articles" by Maximilian II (1527–1576), which became the universal military code for the whole Holy Roman Empire until 1642.

The legal reform seriously weakened the ancient Vehmic court (Vehmgericht, or Secret Tribunal of Westphalia, traditionally held to be instituted by Charlemagne but this theory is now considered unlikely), although it would not be abolished completely until 1811 (when it was abolished under the order of Jérôme Bonaparte).

In 1518, after a general diet of all Habsburg hereditary lands, the emperor issued the Innsbrucker Libell which set out the general
defence order (Verteidigungsordnung) of Austrian provinces, which "gathered together all the elements that had appeared and developed over the preceding centuries.". The provincial army, based on noble cavalry, was for defence only; bonded labourers were conscripted using a proportional conscription system; upper and lower Austrian provinces agreed on a mutual defence pact in which they would form a joint command structure if either were attacked. The military system and other reforms were threatened after Maximilian's deạth but would be restored and reorganized later under Ferdinand I.

According to Brady Jr., Maximilian was no reformer of the church though. Personally pious, he was also a practical caesaropapist who was only interested in the ecclesiastical organization as far as reforms could bring him political and fiscal advantages. He met Luther once at the Diet of Augsburg in 1518, "a rehearsal for Worms in 1521". He saw the grievances and agreed with Luther on some points. However as the religious question was a matter of money and power to him, he had no interest in stopping the indulgences. At this point, he was too busy with his grandson's election. As Luther was about to be arrested by the papal legate, he granted him a letter of safe passage. Brady notes that blindness to the need to reform from above would lead to the reform from below.

Finance and Economy

Maximilian was always troubled by financial shortcomings; his income never seemed to be enough to sustain his large-scale goals and policies. For this reason he was forced to take substantial credits from Upper German banker families, especially from the Gossembrot, Baumgarten, Fugger, and Welser families. Jörg Baumgarten even served as Maximilian's financial advisor. The connection between the emperor and banking families in Augsburg was so widely known that Francis I of France derisively nicknamed him "the Mayor of Augsburg" (another story recounts that a French courtier called him the alderman of Augsburg, to which Louis XII replied: "Yes, but every time that this alderman rings the tocsin from his belfry, he makes all France tremble.", referring to Maximilian's military ability). Around 70 percent of his income went to wars (and by the 1510s, he was waging wars on almost all sides of his border). At the end of Maximilian's rule, the Habsburgs' mountain of debt totalled six million gulden to six and a half million gulden, depending on the sources. By 1531, the remaining amount of debt was estimated at 400,000 gulden (about 282,669 Spanish ducats). In his entire reign, he had spent around 25 million gulden, much of which was contributed by his most loyal subjects – the Tyrolers. The historian Thomas Brady comments: "The best that can be said of his financial practices is that he borrowed democratically from rich and poor alike and defaulted with the same even-handedness". By comparison, when he abdicated in 1556, Charles V left Philip a total debt of 36 million ducats (equal to the income from Spanish America for his entire reign), while Ferdinand I left a debt of 12.5 million gulden when he died in 1564. Economy and economic policies under the reign of Maximilian is a relatively unexplored topic, according to Benecke.

Overall, according to Whaley, "The reign of Maximilian I saw recovery and growth but also growing tension. This created both winners and losers.", although Whaley opines that this is no reason to expect a revolutionary explosion (in connection to Luther and the Reformation). Whaley points out, though, that because Maximilian and Charles V tried to promoted the interests of the Netherlands, after 1500, the Hanseatic League was negatively affected and their growth relative to England and the Netherlands declined.

In the Low Countries, during his regency, to get more money to pay for his campaigns, he resorted to debase coins in the Burgundian mints, causing more conflicts with the interests of the Estates and the merchant class.

In Austria, although this was never enough for his needs, his management of mines and salt works proved efficient, with a marked increase in revenue, the fine silver production in Schwaz increased from 2,800 kg in 1470 to 14,000 kg in 1516. Benecke remarks that Maximilian was a ruthless, exploitative businessman while Hollegger sees him as a clearheaded manager with sober cost-benefit analysis. Ultimately, he had to mortgage these properties to the Fuggers to get quick cash. The financial price would ultimately fall on the Austrian population. Fichtner states that Maximilian's pan-European vision was very expensive, and his financial practices antagonized his subjects both high and low in Burgundy, Austria and Germany (who tried to temper his ambitions, although they never came to hate the charismatic ruler personally), this was still modest in comparison with what was about to come, and the Ottoman threat gave the Austrians a reason to pay.

For both economic and military purposes, he encouraged the mining of copper, silver and calamine, coining, brass manufacturing and the arms industry. He took pains to protect the local economy, especially in Tyrol, where there was a mining boom (accompanied by a population boom), although Safley notes that he also enabled families like the Hochstetters to exploit the economy for their own ends. Agriculture also developed significantly, except in Lower Austria which suffered from the war with Matthias Corvinus.

Augsburg benefitted majorly from the establishment and expansion of the Kaiserliche Reichspost as well as Maximilian's personal attachment to the city. The imperial city became "the dominant centre of early capitalism" of the 16th century, and "the location of the most important post office within the Holy Roman Empire". From Maximilian's time, as the "terminuses of the first transcontinental post lines" began to shift from Innsbruck to Venice and from Brussels to Antwerpt, in these cities, the communication system and the news market started to converge. As the Fuggers as well as other trading companies based their most important branches in these cities, these traders gained access to these systems as well.(Despite a widely circulated theory which holds that the Fuggers themselves operated their own communication system, in reality they relied upon the imperial posts, presumably from the 1490s onwards, as official members of the court of Maximilian I).

Leipzig started its rise into one of the largest European trade fair cities after Maximilian granted them wide-ranged privileges in 1497 (and raised their three markets to the status of Imperial Fair in 1507).

Tu felix Austria nube

Background
Traditionally, German dynasties had exploited the potential of the imperial title to bring Eastern Europe into the fold, in addition to their lands north and south of the Alps. Under Sigismund, the predecessors of the Habsburgs, the Luxemburgs, had managed to gain an empire almost comparable in scale to the later Habsburg empire, although at the same time they lost the Kingdom of Burgundy and control over Italian territories. Their focus on the East, especially Hungary (which was outside the Holy Roman Empire and also gained by the Luxemburgs with a marriage), allowed the new Burgundian rulers from the House of Valois to foster discontent among German princes. Thus, the Habsburgs were forced to refocus their attention on the West. Frederick III's cousin and predecessor, Albert II (who was Sigismund's son-in-law and heir through his marriage with Elizabeth of Luxembourg) had managed to combine the crowns of Germany, Hungary, Bohemia and Croatia under his rule, but he died young. During his rule, Maximilian had a double focus on both the East and the West. The successful expansion (with the notable role of marriage policy) under Maximilian bolstered his position in the Empire, and also created more pressure for an imperial reform, so that they could get more resources and coordinated help from the German territories to defend their realms and counter hostile powers such as France.

Marriage policy under Maximilian

As part of the Treaty of Arras, Maximilian betrothed his three-year-old daughter Margaret to the Dauphin of France (later Charles VIII), son of his adversary Louis XI. The betrothal was the result of clandestine negotiations between Louis XI and Ghent – as Maximilian's position was temporarily weakened by his wife's death, he had no say in the matter.

Dying shortly after signing the Treaty of Le Verger, Francis II, Duke of Brittany, left his realm to his daughter Anne. In her search of alliances to protect her domain from neighboring interests, she betrothed Maximilian I in 1490. About a year later, they married by proxy.

However, Charles VIII and his sister Anne wanted her inheritance for France. So, when the former came of age in 1491, and taking advantage of Maximilian and his father's interest in the succession of their adversary Mathias Corvinus, King of Hungary, Charles repudiated his betrothal to Margaret, invaded Brittany, forced Anne of Brittany to repudiate her unconsummated marriage to Maximilian, and married Anne of Brittany himself.

Margaret then remained in France as a hostage of sorts until 1493, when she was finally returned to her father with the signing of the Treaty of Senlis.

In the same year, as the hostilities of the lengthy Italian Wars with France were in preparation, Maximilian contracted another marriage for himself, this time to Bianca Maria Sforza, daughter of Galeazzo Maria Sforza, Duke of Milan, with the intercession of his brother, Ludovico Sforza, then regent of the duchy after the former's death.

In the East, Maximilian faced the need to reduce the growing pressures on the Empire brought about by treaties between the rulers of France, Poland, Hungary, Bohemia, and Russia, as well as to bolster his dynasty's position – temporarily threatened by the union between Anne of Foix-Candale and Vladislaus II of Hungary, in addition to resistance of the Hungarian magnates – in Bohemia and Hungary (that the Habsburgs claimed through inheritance and overlordship). Maximilian met with the Jagiellonian kings Ladislaus II of Hungary and Bohemia and Sigismund I of Poland at the First Congress of Vienna in 1515. There they arranged for Maximilian's granddaughter Mary to marry Louis, the son of Ladislaus, and for Anne (the sister of Louis) to marry Maximilian's grandson Ferdinand (both grandchildren being the children of Philip the Handsome, Maximilian's son, and Joanna of Castile). The marriages arranged there brought Habsburg kingship over Hungary and Bohemia in 1526. In 1515, Louis was adopted by Maximilian. Maximilian had to serve as the proxy groom to Anna in the betrothal ceremony, because only in 1516 did Ferdinand agree to enter into the marriage, which would happen in 1521.

These political marriages were summed up in the following Latin elegiac couplet, reportedly spoken by Matthias Corvinus: Bella gerant aliī, tū fēlix Austria nūbe/ Nam quae Mars aliīs, dat tibi regna Venus, "Let others wage war, but thou, O happy Austria, marry; for those kingdoms which Mars gives to others, Venus gives to thee."

Contrary to the implication of this motto though, Maximilian waged war aplenty (In four decades of ruling, he waged 27 wars in total). Late in his life though, only the military situation in the East worked well – the Magyars was said to fear him more than the Turks or the Devil. In the West, he could do no more than blocking French expansion and only with Spanish aid. His general strategy was to combine his intricate systems of alliance, military threats and offers of marriage to realize his expansionist ambitions. Using overtures to Russia, Maximilian succeeded in coercing Bohemia, Hungary and Poland into acquiesce in the Habsburgs' expansionist plans. Combining this tactic with military threats, he was able to gain the favourable marriage arrangements In Hungary and Bohemia (which were under the same dynasty).

At the same time, his sprawling panoply of territories as well as potential claims constituted a threat to France, thus forcing Maximilian to continuously launch wars in defense of his possessions in Burgundy, the Low Countries and Italy against four generations of French kings (Louis XI, Charles VIII, Louis XII, Francis I). Coalitions he assembled for this purpose sometimes consisted of non-imperial actors like England. Edward J. Watts comments that the nature of these wars was dynastic, rather than imperial.

Fortune was also a factor that helped to bring about the results of his marriage plans. The double marriage could have given the Jagiellon a claim in Austria, while a potential male child of Margaret and John, a prince of Spain, would have had a claim to a portion of the maternal grandfather's possessions as well. But as it turned out, Vladislaus's male line became extinct, while the frail John died without offspring, so Maximilian's male line was able to claim the thrones.

Death and succession

During his last years, Maximilian began to focus on the question of his succession. His goal was to secure the throne for Charles. According to the traditional view, a credit of one million gulden was provided (to Charles, after Maximilian's death, according to Wiesflecker and Koenigsberger) by the Fuggers (the Cortes had voted over 600,000 crowns for Charles's election campaign, but money from Spain could not arrive quick enough), which was used for advertising and to bribe the prince-electors, and that this was the decisive factor in Charles's successful election. Others point out that while the electors were paid, this was not the reason for the outcome, or at most played only a small part. The important factor that swayed the final decision was that Frederick refused the offer, and made a speech in support of Charles on the ground that they needed a strong leader against the Ottomans, Charles had the resources and was a prince of German extraction. The death of Maximilian in 1519 seemed to put the succession at risk, but in a few months the election of Charles V was secured.

In 1501, Maximilian fell from his horse and badly injured his leg, causing him pain for the rest of his life. Some historians have suggested that Maximilian was "morbidly" depressed: from 1514, he travelled everywhere with his coffin. In 1518, feeling his death near after seeing an eclipse, he returned to his beloved Innsbruck, but the city's innskeepers and purveyors did not grant the emperor's entourage further credit. The resulting fit led to a stroke that left him bedridden on 15 December 1518. He continued to read documents and received foreign envoys right until the end though. Maximilian died in Wels, Upper Austria, at three o'clock in the morning on 12 January 1519. Different historians have listed different diseases as the main cause of death, including cancer (likely stomach cancer or intestinal cancer), pneumonia, syphilis, gall stones, stroke (he did have a combination of dangerous medical problems) etc.

Maximilian was succeeded as Emperor by his grandson Charles V, his son Philip the Handsome having died in 1506. For penitential reasons, Maximilian gave very specific instructions for the treatment of his body after death. He wanted his hair to be cut off and his teeth knocked out, and the body was to be whipped and covered with lime and ash, wrapped in linen, and "publicly displayed to show the perishableness of all earthly glory". Gregor Reisch, the emperor's friend and confessor who closed his eyes, did not obey the instruction though. He placed a rosary in Maximilian's hand and other sacred objects near the corpse. He was buried in the Castle Chapel at Wiener Neustadt on borrowed money. The casket was opened during renovation under Maria Theresa. After that, the body was reinterred in a Baroque sarcophagus, that later was found unscathed amidst the wreckage of the chapel (due to the Second World War) on 6 August 1946. The emperor was ceremoniously buried again in 1950.

Legacy

Despite his reputation as "the last knight" (and his penchant for personally commanding battles and leading a peripatetic court), as a politician, Maximilian also carried out "herculean tasks of bureaucracy" every day of his adult life (the emperor boasted that he could dictate, simultaneously, to half a dozen secretaries). At the same time, James M. Bradburne remarks that, "Naturally every ruler wanted to be seen as a victor, but Maximilian aspired to the role of Apollo Musagetes." The circle of humanists gathered around him and other contemporary admirers also tended to depict him as such. Maximilian was a universal patron, whose intellect and imagination, according to historian Sydney Anglo, made the courtier of Castiliogne look like a scaled-down version. Anglo points out, though, that the emperor treated his artists and scholars like mere tools (whom he also tended to fail to pay adequately or timely) to serve his purposes, and never autonomous forces. Maximilian did not play the roles of the sponsor and commissioner only, but as organizer, stimulator and planner, he joined the creative processes, drew up the programmes, suggested improvements, checked and decided on the details, invented devices, almost regardless of the time and material resources required. His creativity was not limited to the practical issues of politics, economy and war, but extended to the areas of arts, sciences, hunting, fishing and especially technical innovations, inclụding the creation of all kinds of military equipment, fortifications, precious metal processing or the mining industry. These activities though were time-consuming and the effort the emperor poured in such activities was sometimes criticized as excessive, or that they distracted him from the main tasks of a ruler. In the nineteenth century and early twentieth century, some even criticized him for possessing the qualities that befitted a genius more than a ruler, or that his intellect that saw too far made him unwisely try to force the march of time.

Military innovation, chivalry, and equipment

Maximilian was a capable commander (Although, he lost many wars, usually due to the lack of financial resources. The notable commentators of his time, including Machiavelli, Piero Vettori and Guicciardini rated him as a great general, or in the words of Machivelli, "second to none", but pointed out that extravagance, terrible management of financial resources and other character defects tended to lead to the failures of grand schemes. According to Matthias Pfaffenbichler, he did not accept the truth that war depended on money, and thus the problem was that despite his military-tactical talents, he rarely managed to convert military victories into long-term political successes). and a military innovator who contributed to the modernization of warfare. He and his condottiero George von Frundsberg organized the first formations of the Landsknechte based on inspiration from Swiss pikemen, but increased the ratio of pikemen and favoured handgunners over the crossbowmen, with new tactics being developed, leading to improvement in performance. Discipline, drilling and a highly developed staff by the standard of the era were also instilled. The "war apparatus" he created later played an essential role in Austria's rank as great power. Maximilian was the founder and organiser of the arms industry of the Habsburgs. He started the standardization of the artillery (according to the weight of the cannonballs) and made them more mobile. He sponsored new types of cannons, initiated many innovations that improved the range and damage so that cannons worked better against thick walls, and concerned himself with the metallurgy, as cannons often exploded when ignited and caused damage among his own troops. According to contemporary accounts, he could field an artillery of 105 cannons, including both iron and bronze guns of various sizes. The artillery force is considered by some to be the most developed of the day. The arsenal in Innsbruck, created by Maximilian, was one of the most notable artillery arsenals in Europe. His typical tactic was: artillery should attack first, the cavalry would act as shock troops and attack the flanks, infantry fought in tightly knitted formation at the middle.

A figure who contributed greatly to the development of the Innsbruck arsenal was Gregor Löffler. He entered Maximilian's service in 1513, following in the footsteps of his father Peter; his son Hans Christoph would also be the leading gunfounder in Europe. Löffler was the first gun master who became an arms manufacturer (who produced weapons on an industrial scale), and was also responsible for casting many of the statues in Maximilian's cenotaph. In addition to the central arsenal in Innsbruck, Maximilian built a chain of arsenals to protect his border: those in Sigmundskron and Trent against Italians, in Lindau against the Swiss, in Breisach against the French, in Vienna against the Hungarians, in Graz, Hochosterwitz, Laibach, Gorizia against the Turks and Venetians. In addition, there were the old Burgundian arsenals against France. On the other hand, Wilfried Tittmann stresses the central importance of the arms manufacturing center in Nuremberg (where the earliest handguns, which proved suitable for the field and export, were developed), not only concerning  Maximilian's military system but also the early modern military revolution in general. Puype notices that Tittmann and Eugen Heer share the view that Maximilian's industrialization policy made Nuremberg "the metropole of the Upper German armament industry." Marius Mutz opines that Tittmann's demonstration of Nuremberg's importance is generally convincing, but that some of his points, notably that Hans Kalteisen (who served Maximilian and was Löffler's rival) had a Nuremberg origin or that developments in Innsbruck were based on Nuremberg's technology as well, are a bit overambitious.

Maximilian was described by the nineteenth-century politician Anton Alexander Graf von Auersperg as "the last knight" (der letzte Ritter), and this epithet has stuck to him. Some historians note that the epithet rings true yet is ironic, because, as the father of the Landsknechte (of which the paternity he shared with George von Frundsberg) and "the first cannoneer of the nation", he ended the combat supremacy of the cavalry, and his death heralded the military revolution of the next two centuries. Moreover, his multifaceted reforms broke the back of the knight class both militarily and politically. He threw his own weight behind the promotion of the infantry soldier, leading them in battles on foot with a pike on his shoulder and giving the commanders honours and titles. To Maximilian, the rise of the new martial ethic  including even its violent aspect – associated with the rise of the Landsknechte, was also an unextractable part of his own masculine identity. He believed that fighting alongside his foot soldiers legitimized his right to rule more than did any noble trapping or title. In his time, though, social tensions were brewing, and the nobles resisted this belief. At the Siege of Padua 1509, commanding a French-German allied army, Maximilian ordered the noble knights to dismount to help the Landsknechte to storm a breach, but Chevalier Bayard criticized him for putting noblemen at risk alongside "cobblers, blacksmiths, bakers, and laborers, and who do not hold their honor in like esteem as gentlemen." Even merely mixing the two on the same battlefield was considered insulting. The French then refused to obey. The siege broke when the German knights refused to continue their assaults on foot and demanded to fight on horseback, also on basis of status. A furious Maximilian left the camp and ordered the army to retreat.

With Maximilian's establishment and use of the Landsknechte, the military organisation in Germany was altered in a major way. Here began the rise of military enterprisers, who raised mercenaries with a system of subcontractors to make war on credit, and acted as the commanding generals of their own armies. Maximilian became an expert military enterpriser himself, leading his father to consider him a spendthrift military adventurer who wandered into new wars and debts while still recovering from the previous campaigns.

Regarding the cavalry, in 1500, using the French gendarmes as a model, he organized his heavy cavalry, called the kyrisser. These cavalrymen, still mostly noblemen, were still fully armed, but more lightly – these were the predecessors of cuirassiers. Non-nobles began to be accepted into the cavalry (mostly serving as light cavalry – each lanze, or lance, contained one kyrisser and six to seven light cavalrymen) and occasionally, he knighted them too. For heavy as well as light cavalry, firearms began to replace cold weapons.
{{multiple image
|background color = #F2CECE
|image1 = Große Hakenbüchsen, Zeugbuch Maximilians.jpg
|caption1 = Great arquebus for two shooters, fol.72r. In battles, the main force of a Landskneckt regiment created a formation called Gewalthaufen. After the first encounter, those armed with melee weapons attacked the enemies at close range while arquebusiers moved in front or between various formations, while the artillery would be covered by the rear guards.
|image2 = Das Hauptstück Der Leo, Zeugbuch Maximilians.jpg
|caption2 = Hauptstück (main gun) Der Leo, used in the Siege of Kufstein (1504). Although one of the heaviest cannons, it failed to breach Kufstein's walls together with other cannons that shot stone balls. Only the Purlepaus and the Weckauf, the two largest cannons of the time, destroyed Kufstein almost all on their own with iron balls.
|total_width = 400
|align  = right
|footer_align = center
|footer = Images from [[c:File:Book of Armaments of Emperor Maximilian I WDL8971.pdf|Book of Armaments' (Zeugbuch) of Maximilian]]
}}

In military medicine, Maximilian introduced structured triage (triage itself had existed since the Ancient Egypt). It was in his armies that the wounded was first categorized and treated according to an order of priority – in times of war, higher priority was given to military personnel over civilians and the higher-ranked over the lower-ranked. The practice spread to other armies in the following centuries and coined "triage" by the French. During the Middle Age, European armies tended to bring with them workers who served the soldiers both as barbers (this was their chief function, thus the origin of their name in German, Feldscherer, or field shearer) and low-skilled paramedics (as opposed to a trained medicus) who worked on their external wounds. Beginning with Maximilian, each captain of a detachment (of 200–500 men) was compelled to bring a capable Feldscherer and provide him with medicine and equipments. These paramedics were subject to a level of control under a Oberfeldarzt (chief field doctor), although their organization was not stabilized until the seventeenth century and it also took a long time before the average level of these paramedics was raised substantially. The birth of the modern feldsher led to the formation of a military medical service, whose primary task, other than giving first aid,  was to transport the wounded out of the battlefield as fast as possible with palanquins and wheelbarrows.

The emperor would not live to see the fruits of his military reforms, which were also widely adopted by the territories in the Empire and other nations in Europe. Moreover, the landsknechte's mode of fighting boosted the strength of the territorial polities, while more centralized nations were able to utilize them in ways German rulers could not. Kleinschmidt concludes that, in the end, Maximilian did good service to the competitors of his own grandson.

While favouring more modern methods in his actual military undertakings, Maximilian had a genuine interest in promoting chivalric traditions like the tournament, being an exceptional jouster himself. The tournaments helped to enhance his personal image and solidify a network of princes and nobles over whom he kept a close watch, fostering fidelity and fraternity among the competitors. Taking inspiration from the Burgundy tournament, he developed the German tournament into a distinctive entity. In addition, during at least two occasions in his campaigns, he challenged and killed French knights in duel-like preludes to battles.

Knights reacted to their decreased condition and loss of privileges in different ways. Some asserted their traditional rights in violent ways and became robber knights like Götz von Berlichingen. The knights as a social group became an obstacle to Maximilian's law and order and the relationship between them and "the last knight" became antagonistic. Some probably also felt slighted by the way imperial propaganda presented Maximilian as the sole defender of knightly values. In the Diet of Worms in 1495, the emperor, the archbishops, great princes and free cities joined force to initiate the Perpetual Land Peace (Ewige Landfriede), forbidding all private feuding, in order to protect the rising tide of commerce. The tournament sponsored by the emperor was thus a tool to appease the knights, although it became a recreational, yet still deadly extreme sport. After spending 20 years creating and supporting policies against the knights though, Maximilian changed his ways and began trying to engage them to integrate them into his frame of rulership. In 1517, he lifted the ban on Franz von Sickingen, a leading figure among the knights and took him into his service. In the same year, he summoned the Rhenish knights and introduced his Ritterrecht (Knight's Rights), which would provide the free knight with a special law court, in exchange of their oaths for being obedient to the emperor and abstaining from evil deeds. He did not succeed in collecting taxes from them or creating a knights' association, but an ideology or frame emerged, that allowed the knights to retain their freedom while fostering the relationship between the crown and the sword.

Maximilian had a great passion for armour, not only as equipment for battle or tournaments, but as an art form. He prided himself on his armor designing expertise and knowledge of metallurgy. Under his patronage, "the art of the armorer blossomed like never before." Master armorers across Europe like Lorenz Helmschmid, Konrad Seusenhofer, Franck Scroo and Daniel Hopfer (who was the first to etch on iron as part of an artistic process, using an acid wash) created custom-made armors that often served as extravagant gifts to display Maximilian's generosity and devices that would produce special effects (often initiated by the emperor himself) in tournaments. The style of armour that became popular during the second half of his reign featured elaborate fluting and metalworking, and became known as Maximilian armour. It emphasized the details in the shaping of the metal itself, rather than the etched or gilded designs popular in the Milanese style. Maximilian also gave a bizarre jousting helmet as a gift to King Henry VIII – the helmet's visor features a human face, with eyes, nose and a grinning mouth, and was modelled after the appearance of Maximilian himself. It also sports a pair of curled ram's horns, brass spectacles, and even etched beard stubble. Knowing that the extinct Treizsaurbeyn (likely Treitzsauerwein) family had a method to make extra tough armours that could not be shot through by any crossbow, he sought their servant Caspar Riederer, who helped Konrad Seusenhofer to recreate the armour type. With knowledge gained from Riederer, Maximilian invented a method "so that in his workshops 30 front and back plates could be made at once", in order to help his soldiers and especially his Landsknechte. The details of the process described are currently not known, but likely utilizing matrices with where armour parts could be stamped out from sheet metal.

Maximilian associated the practical art of hunting (as well as fishing and falconry) with his status as prince and knight. He introduced parforce and park hunting to Germany. He also published essays on these topics. In this he followed Frederick II Hohenstaufen and was equally attentive to naturalist details but less scientific. His Tyrol Fishery Book (Tiroler Fischereibuch) was composed with the help from his fish master Martin Fritz and Wolfgang Hohenleiter. To keep fish fresh, he invented a special kind of fish container.
While he was unconcerned with the disappearance or weakening of the knight class due to the development of artillery and infantry, Maximilian worried greatly about the vulnerability of ibexes, described by him as "noble creatures", in front of handguns and criticized the peasants in particular for having no moderation. In 1517, the emperor banned the manufacturing and possession of the wheellock, which was designed and especially effective for hunting. Another possible reason for this earliest attempt at gun control might be related to worries about the spreading of crimes. He investigated, classified and protected game reserves, which also damaged the farmers' crops as he forbade them to erect fences. Game population quickly increased though. In one case, he became an unintentional species conservationist: As he had Tyrolean mountain lakes stocked with trouts, a variety of the last trout originating from the Danube, the Kaiser Max trout, has survived until this day in Gossenköllesee.

Since he was young, in Germany and especially in the Low Countries, he paid attention to the burghers' art of archery, joined archery competitions and gave patronage to crossbow and archery guilds (in military affairs though, he officially abolished the crossbow in 1517 despite its continued use in other countries). Although he never gained complete popular support in Flanders, these patronage activities helped him to build up a relationship with guild members who participated in his campaigns, notably for Guinegate (1479), and rally urban support during his time in the Low Countries. His name heads the list of lords in the huge 1488 Saint George guild-book in Ghent. In the early sixteenth century, he built a Guildhouse for the St.Sebastian's Archers at The Hague.

The 1511 Landlibell (a military statue and "a cornerstone of Tyrol's democracy", which established the foundation for Tyrol's separate defence organization by exempting the population from military service outside their borders but requiring them to serve in the defence of their region, and recognizing the connection between freedom and the rights to bear arms), which remained largely in effect until the fall of monarchy, led to the establishment of armed militia formations called (Tiroler) Schützen. The term Schützen had been used to refer to men armed with crossbows, but Maximilian enthusiastically encouraged riflemen and firearms. These formations still exist, although they have become non-governmental since 1918. In 2019, they organized a great shooting event in commemoration of the emperor.

Another art associated with chivalry and military activities was dancing. As the landsknechte's fighting techniques were developed, they no longer preferred fighting along a straight line (as exercised by even the Swiss until the end of the fifteenth century), but leaned towards a circle-wise movement that enhanced the use of the space around the combatant and allowed them to attack the opponents from different angles. The circle-wise formation described by Jean Molinet as the "snail" would become the hallmark of landsknechte's combat. The new types of combat also required the maintenance of a stable bodily equilibrium. Maximilian, an innovator of these types of movements, also saw value in their effects over the maintenance of group discipline (apart from the control of centralized institutions). As Maximilian and his commanders sought to popularize these forms of movements (which only became daily practice at the end of the fifteen century and gained dominance after Maximilian's death in 1519), he promoted them in tournaments, in fencing and in dancing as well – which started to focus on steps and the movements of the feet over the movements of the head and the arms. The courtly festivals became a playground for innovations, foreshadowing developemts in military practices. Regarding dancing, other elements favoured by Maximilian's court were the Moriskentan ("Moors' dance", "Morris-dance", or Moresca), the masquerades (mummerei) and the use of torchbearers. Torchbearers are a part of almost all of the illustrated costumed circle dances in the Weisskunig and Freydal, with Maximilian himself usually being one of them. Masquerades usually included dancing to the music of fifes and drums, performed by the same musicians who served the new infantry forces. The famous humanist philosopher Julius Caesar Scaliger, who grew up as a page at Maximilian's court, reportedly performed the Pyrrhic war dance, which he reconstructed from ancient sources, in front of the emperor. The annual Tänzelfest, the oldest children's festival in Bavaria, reportedly founded by Maximilian in 1497 (the event only appeared in written sources from 1658), includes dancing, processions, and reenactment of city life under Maximilian.

Cultural patronage, reforms, and image building

Maximilian was a keen supporter of the arts and sciences, and he surrounded himself with scholars such as Joachim Vadian and Andreas Stoberl (Stiborius), promoting them to important court posts. Many of them were commissioned to assist him complete a series of projects, in different art forms, intended to glorify for posterity his life and deeds and those of his Habsburg ancestors. He referred to these projects as Gedechtnus ("memorial"), which included a series of stylised autobiographical works: the epic poems Theuerdank and Freydal, and the chivalric novel Weisskunig, both published in editions lavishly illustrated with woodcuts. In this vein, he commissioned a series of three monumental woodblock prints: The Triumphal Arch (1512–18, 192 woodcut panels, 295 cm wide and 357 cm high – approximately 9'8" by 11'8½"); and a Triumphal Procession (1516–18, 137 woodcut panels, 54 m long), which is led by a Large Triumphal Carriage (1522, 8 woodcut panels, 1½' high and 8' long), created by artists including Albrecht Dürer, Albrecht Altdorfer and Hans Burgkmair.Triumphal Procession According to The Last Knight: The Art, Armor, and Ambition of Maximilian I, Maximilian dictated large parts of the books to his secretary and friend Marx Treitzsaurwein who did the rewriting.  Authors of the book Emperor Maximilian I and the Age of Durer cast doubt on his role as a true patron of the arts though, as he tended to favor pragmatic elements over high arts. On the other hand, he was a perfectionist who involved himself with every stage of the creative processes. His goals extended far beyond the emperor's own glorification too: commemoration also included the documentation in details of the presence and the restoration of source materials and precious artifacts.

Notorious for his micro-managing, there was a notable case in which the emperor allowed and encouraged free-ranging, even wild improvisations: his Book of Prayers. The work shows a lack of constraint, and no consistent iconographic program on the part of the artist (Dürer), which would be realized and highly praised by Goethe in 1811.

In 1504, Maximilian commissioned the Ambraser Heldenbuch, a compendium of German medieval narratives (the majority was heroic epics), which was written by Hans Ried. The work was of great importance to German literature because among its twenty five narratives, fifteen was unique. This would be the last time the Nibelungenlied was enshrined in German literature before being rediscovered again 250 years later. Maximilian was also a patron of Ulrich von Hutten whom he crowned as Poet Laureate in 1517 and the humanist Willibald Pirckheimer, who was one of Germany's most important patrons of arts in his own right.

As Rex litteratus, he supported all the literary genres that had been supported by his predecessors, in addition to drama, a genre that had been gaining in popularity in his era. Joseph Grünpeck attracted his attention with Comoediae duae, presumably the first German Neo-Latin festival plays. He was impressed with Joseph Grünpeck's Streit zwischen Virtus und Fallacicaptrix, a morality play in which Maximilian himself was asked to choose between virtue and base pleasure. Celtis wrote for him Ludus Dianae and Rhapsodia de laudibus et victoria Maximiliani de Boemannis. The Ludus Dianae displays the symbiotic relationship between ruler and humanist, who are both portrayed as Apollonian or Phoebeian, while Saturn – as counterpole of Phoebus – is a negative force and Bacchus as well as Venus display dangerous aspects in tempting humans towards a depraving life. Locher wrote the first German Neo-Latin tragedy, also the first German Humanist tragedy, the Historia de Rege Frantie. Other notable authors included Benedictus Chelidonius and Hieronymus Vehus. These plays often doubled as encomium or dramatized newe zeittung (news reports) in support of imperial or princely politics. Douglas A.Russel remarks that the academic mode of theater associated with the new interest Humanism and the Classics at that time that was mainly the work of Konrad Celtis, Joachim von Watt (who was a poet laureate crowned by Maximilian and at age 32 was Rector at the University of Vienna), and Benedictus Chelidonius. William Cecil McDonald comments that, in the context of German medieval literary patronage, "Maximilian's literary activities not only 'summarize' the literary patronage of the Middle Ages, but also represent a point of departure – a beacon for a new age." Moreover, "Like Charlemagne, Otto the Great, Henry II, and Frederick Barbarossa, Maximilian was a fostering spirit, i.e. he not only commissioned literature, but through his policies and the force of his personality he created a climate conducive to the flowering of the arts."

Under his rule, the University of Vienna reached its apogee as a centre of humanistic thought. He established the College of Poets and Mathematicians which was incorporated into the university. Maximilian invited Conrad Celtis, the leading German scientist of their day to University of Vienna. Celtis found the  Sodalitas litteraria Danubiana (which was also supported by Maximilian), an association of scholars from the Danube area, to support literature and humanist thought. Maximilian also promoted the development of the young Habsburg University of Freiburg and its host city, in consideration of the city's strategic position. He gave the city privileges, helped it to turn the corner financially while utilizing the university's professors for important diplomatic missions and key positions at the court. The Chancellor Konrad Stürtzel, twice the university's rector, acted as the bridge between Maximilian and Freiburg. Maximilian supported and utilized the humanists partly for propaganda effect, partly for his genealogical projects, but he also employed several as secretaries and counsellors – in their selection he rejected class barriers, believing that "intelligent minds deriving their nobility from God", even if this caused conflicts (even physical attacks) with the nobles. He relied on his humanists to create a nationalistic imperial myth, in order to unify the Reich against the French in Italy, as pretext for a later Crusade (the Estates protested against investing their resources in Italy though). Maximilian told his Electors each to establish a university in their realm. Thus in 1502 and 1506, together with the Elector of Saxony and the Elector of Brandenburg, respectively, he co-found the University of Wittenberg and the University of Frankfurt. The University of Wittenberg was the first German university established without a papal bull, signifying the secular imperial authority concerning universities. This first center in the North where old Latin scholarly traditions were overthrown would become the home of Luther and Melanchthon.

As he was too distant, his patronage of Humanism and humanistic books in particular did not reach the Netherlands (and as Mary of Burgundy died too young while Philip the Fair and Charles V were educated in the Burgundian tradition, there was no sovereign who fostered humanistic Latin culture in the Netherlands, although they had their own mode of learning). There were exchanges and arguments over political ideas and values between the two sides though. Maximilian greatly admired his father-in-law Charles the Bold (he even adopted Charles's motto as one of his own, namely, "I dared it!", or "Je l'ay emprint!") and promoted his conception that the sovereign's power and magnificence came directly from God and not through the mediation of the Church. This concept was part of Maximilian's political program (including other elements such as the recovery of Italy, the position of the Emperor as dominus mundi, expansionism, the crusade...etc.), supported in the Netherlands by Paul of Middelburg but considered extreme by Erasmus. Concerning heroic models that rulers should follow (especially concerning the education of Archiduke Charles, who would later be influenced much by his grandfather's knightly image), Antoine Haneron proposed ancient heroes, above all Alexander (who Charles also adopted as a great role model for all his life) while Molinet presented Alexander, Caesar and Semiramis, but Erasmus protested Alexander, Caesar and Xerxes as models. Maximilian strongly promoted the first two though, as well as St.George (both in "Frederican" and "Burgundian" forms). The idea of peace also became more pronounced in Maximilian's court in his last years though, likely influenced by Flemish humanism, especially Erasmian (Maximilian himself was an unabashed warlike prince, but late in his life, he did recognize that his 27 wars only served the devil). Responding to the intense Burgundian humanistic discourse on nobility by birth and nobility by virtue, the emperor pushed his own modification: office versus birth (with a strong emphasis on the primacy of office over birth). Noflatscher opines that the emperor was probably the most important mediator of the Burgundian model himself, with Bianca Maria also having influence (although she could only partially fulfill her role).

The Italian philosopher Gianfrancesco Pico della Mirandola dedicated his 1500 work De imaginatione, a treatise on the human mind (in which he synthesized Aristotle, Neoplatonism and Girolamo Savonarola), to Maximilian. The Italian philosopher and theologian Tommaso Radini Tedeschi also dedicated his 1511 work La Calipsychia sive de pulchritudine animae to the emperor.

In philosophy, besides Humanism, esotericism had a notable influence during Maximilian's time. In 1505, he sent Johannes Trithemius eight questions concerning spiritual and religious matters (Questions 3, 5, 6, 7 were concerned with witchcraft) that Trithemius answered and later published in the 1515 book Liber octo questionum (Books of eight questions). Maximilian displayed a skeptical aspect, posing questions such as why God permitted witches and their powers to control evil spirits. The authors (now usually identified as Heinrich Kramer alone) of the most notorious work on witchcraft of the time, Malleus Maleficarum, claimed that they had his letter of approval (supposedly issued in November 1486) to act as inquisitors, but according to Behringer, Durrant and Bailey, he likely never supported them (although Kramer apparently went to Brussels, the Burgundian capital, in 1486, hoping to influence the young King – they did not dare to involve Frederick III, whom Kramer had offended some years earlier). Trithemius dedicated the De septem secundeis ("The Seven Secondary Intelligences"), which argued that the cycle of ages was ruled by seven planetary angels, in addition to God (the First Intelligence). The historian Martin Hollegger notes though that Maximilian himself did not share the cyclical view of history, typical for their contemporaries, nor believed that their age would be the last age. He had a linear understanding of time – that progresses would make the world better. The kabbalistic elements in the court as well as Trithemius himself influenced the thinking of the famous polymath and occultist Heinrich Cornelius Agrippa (who in Maximilian's time served mainly as secretary, soldier and diplomatic spy). The emperor, having interest in the occult himself, intended to write two books on magic (Zauberpuech) and black magic (Schwartzcunnstpuech) but did not have time for them.

Like his father, Maximilian was an alchemist, who at times locked himself up in his room for days to experiment. He collaborated with his sister-in-law Caterina Sforza (her work Experiments records a recipe for an emetic powder attributed to him). He sponsored such experiments too. According to Leonhard Thurneysser, in 1499 an alchemist named Schwichard Fronberger set up for him an astro-alchemical project that would theoretically produce silver in 1547 and gold in 1598 (Maximilian was 40 in 1499). In his circle, Reisch and Agrippa were also interested in alchemy, although Agrippa joined a secret society that did not allow publishing about this topic.

The establishment of the new Courts and the formal Reception of Roman Law in 1495 led to the formation of a professional lawyer class as well as a bureaucratic judiciary. Legal scholars trained in mos italicus (either in Italian universities or in newly established German universities) became in demand. Among the prominent lawyers and legal scholars  who served Maximilian in various capacities and provided legal advices to the emperor were Mercurino Gattinara, Sebastian Brandt and Ulrich Zasius. Together with the aristocrats and the literati (who participated in Maximilian's propaganda and intellectual projects), the lawyers and legal scholars became one of three main groups in Maximilian's court. Konrad Stürtzel, the Chancellor, belonged to this group. In Maximilian's court – more egalitarian than any previous German or Imperial court, with its burghers and peasants – all these groups were treated equally in promotions and rewards. The individuals were also blending in many respects, usually through marriage alliances.

Maximilian was an energetic patron of the library. Previous Habsburg rulers such as Albert III and Maximilian's father Frederick III (who collected the 110 books that were the core inventory of the later library) had also been instrumental in centralizing art treasures and book collections. Maximilian became a bibliophile during the time he was in the Low Countries. As husband of Mary of Burgundy, he would come into possession of the huge Burgundian library, which according to some sources was brought to Austria when he returned to his native land. According to the official website of the Austrian National Library though, the Habsburgs only brought the collection to Vienna in 1581. Maximilian also inherited the Tyrol library of his uncle Sigismund, also a great cultural patron (which had received a large contribution from Eleanor of Scotland, Sigismund's wife and also a great lover of books). When he married Bianca Maria, Italian masterpieces were incorporated into the collection. The collection became more organized when Maximilian commissioned Ladislaus Sunthaim, Jakob Mennel and Johannes Cuspinian to acquire and compose books. By the beginning of the sixteenth century, the library had acquired significant Bohemian, French and Italian book art. In 1504, Conrad Celtis spoke the first time of the Bibliotheca Regia (which would evolve into the Imperial Library, and as it is named today, the Österreichische Nationalbibliothek or the Austrian National Library), an organized library that had been expanded through purchases. Maximilian's collection was dispersed between Innsbruck, Vienna and Wiener Neustadt. The Wiener Neustadt part was under Conrad Celtis's management. The more valuable part was in Innbruck. Already in Maximilian's time, the idea and function of libraries were changing and it became important that scholars gained access to the books. Under Maximilian, who was casual in his attitude to scholars (which marvelled the French chronicler Pierre Frossart, it was fairly easy for a scholar to gain access to the emperor, the court and thus the library. But despite the intention of rulers like Maximilian II (and his chief Imperial Librarian Blotius) and Charles VI to make the library open to the general public, the process was only completed in 1860.

During Maximilian's time, there were several projects of an encyclopaedic nature, among them the incomplete projects of Conrad Celtis. However, as the founder of the Collegium poetarum et mathematicorum and a "program thinker" (programmdenker, term used by Jan-Dirk Müller and Hans-Joachim Ziegeler), Celtis established an encyclopaedic-scientific model that increasingly integrated and favoured mechanical arts in relation to the combination between natural sciences and technology and associated them with divina fabrica (God's creation in the six days). In consistence with Celtis's design, the university's curriculum and the political and scientific order of Maximilian's time (which was also influenced by developments in the previous eras), the humanist Gregor Reisch, who was also Maximilian's confessor, produced the Margarita Philosophica, "the first modern encyclopaedia of any importance", first published in 1503. The work covers rhetoric, grammar, logic, music, mathematical topics, childbirth, astronomy, astrology, chemical topics (including alchemy), and hell.

An area that saw many new developments under Maximilian was cartography, of which the important center in Germany was Nuremberg. In 1515, Dürer and Johannes Stabius created the first world map projected on a solid geometric sphere. Bert De Munck and Antonella Romano make a connection between the mapmaking activities of Dürer and Stabius with efforts to grasp, manipulate and represent time and space, which was also associated with Maximilian's "unprecedented dynastic mythmaking" and pioneering printed works like the Triumphal Arch and the Triumphal Procession. Maximilian assigned Johannes Cuspinianus and Stabius to compile a topography of Austrian lands and a set of regional maps. Stabius and his friend Georg Tannstetter worked together on the maps. The work appeared in 1533 but without maps. The 1528 Lazarus-Tannstetter map of Tabulae Hungariae (one of the first regional maps in Europe) though seemed to be related to the project. The cartographers Martin Waldseemüller and Matthias Ringmann dedicated their famous work Universalis Cosmographia to Maximilian, although the direct backer was Rene II of Loraine. The 1513 edition of Geography, which contained this map and was also dedicated to Maximilian, by Jacobus Aeschler and Georgius Ubelin, is considered by Armando Cortes to be the climax of a cartography revolution. The emperor himself dabbled in cartography. According to Buisseret, Maximilian could "call upon a variety of cartographic talent unrivalled anywhere else in Europe at that time" (that included Celtis, Stabius, Cuspinianus, Jacob Ziegler, Johannes Aventinus and Tannstetter). The development in cartography was tied to the emperor's special interest in sea route exploration, as an activity concerning his global monarchy concept, and his responsibilities as Duke consort to Mary of Burgundy, grandfather of the future ruler of Spain as well as ally and close relation to Portuguese kings. He sent men like Martin Behaim und Hieronymus Münzer to the Portuguese court to cooperate in their exploration efforts as well as to act as his own representatives. Another involved in the network was the Flemish Josse van Huerter or Joss de Utra who would become the first settler  of the island of Faial in the Portuguese Azores. Maximilian also played an essential role in connecting the financial houses in Augsburg and Nuremberg (including the companies of Höchstetter, Fugger and Welser etc.) to Portuguese expeditions. In exchange for financial backing, King Manuel provided German investors with generous privileges. The humanist Conrad Peutinger was an important agent who acted as advisor to financiers, translator of voyage records and imperial councillor. Harald Kleinschmidt opines that regarding the matter of world exploration as well as the "transformation of European world picture" in general, Maximilian was "a crucial though much underestimated figure" of his time.

The evolution of cartography was connected to development in ethnography and the new Humanist science of chorography (promoted by Celtis at the University of Vienna). As Maximilian already promoted the Ur-German after much archaeological and textual excavation as well as embraced the early German wildness, Peutinger correctly deduced that he would support German exploration of another primitive people as well. Using the Welser's commercial ventures as a pretext, Peutinger goaded Maximilian into backing his ethnographical interests in the Indians and supporting the 1505–1506 voyage of Balthasar Springer around Africa to India. Besides, this endeavour added to the emperor's image as a conqueror and ruler, also to rival the claims of his arch-rival Suleiman the Magnificent regarding a global empire. Based on an instruction dictated by Maximilian in 1512 regarding Indians in the Triumphal Procession, Jörg Kölderer executed a series of (now lost) drawings, which served as the guideline for Altdorfer's miniatures in 1513–1515, which in turn became the model for woodcuts (half of them based on now lost 1516–1518 drawings by Burgkmair) showing "the people of Calicut." In 1508, Burgkmair produced the People of Africa and India series, focusing on depicting the peoples whom Springer encountered along coastal Africa and India. The series brought into being "a basic set of analytic categories that ethnography would take as its methodological foundation". As part of his dealings with Moscow, the Jagiellons and the Slavic East in general, Maximilian surrounded himself with people from the Slovenian territories and familiar with Slavic languages, such as Sigismund von Herberstein (himself a prominent ethnographer), Petrus Bonomo, George Slatkonia and Paulus Oberstain. Political necessities overcame the prejudice against living languages, which started to find a place along Latin throughout central Europe, also in scholarly areas.

The emperor's program of restoring the University of Vienna to its former pre-eminence was also concerned with astrology and astronomy. He realized the potential of the print press when combined with these branches of learning, and employed Georg Tannstetter (who, in 1509, was appointed by Maximilian as the Professor of Astronomy at the University of Vienna and also worked for a joint calendar reform attempt with the Pope) to produce yearly practica and wall calendars. In 1515, Stabius (who also acted as the court astronomer), Dürer and the astronomer Konrad Heinfogel produced the first planispheres of both southern and northerns hemispheres, also the first printed celestial maps. These maps prompted the revival of interest in the field of uranometry throughout Europe. The Ensisheim meteorite fell on earth during the reign of Maximilian (7 November 1492). This was one of the oldest meteorite impacts in recorded history. King Maximilian, who was on his way to a campaign against France, ordered for it to be dug up and preserved at a local church. The meteorite, as a good omen, was utilized for propaganda against France through the use of broadsheets with dramatic pictures under the direction of the poet Sebastian Brandt (as Maximilian defeated a far larger French army to his own in Senlis two months later, the news would spread even more).

On the subject of calendars and calendar reform, already in 1484,  the famous Flemish scientist Paul of Middelburg dedicated his  Praenostica ad viginti annos duratura to Maximilian. His 1513 magnum opus Paulina de recta Paschae celebratione was also dedicated to Maximilian, together with Leo X.

In addition to maps, other astrological, geometrical and horological instruments were also developed, chiefly by Stiborius and Stabius, who understood the need to cooperate with the emperors to make these instruments into useful tools for propaganda also. The extraordinarily luxurious planetarium, that took twelve men to carry and was given as a diplomatic gift by Ferdinand I to Suleiman the Magnificent in 1541, originally belonged to Maximilian. He loved to introduce newly invented musical instruments. In 1506, he had a special regal, likely the apfelregal seen in one of Hans Weiditz's woodcuts, built for Paul Hofhaimer. The emperor's favourite musical instrument maker was Hans Georg Neuschel of Nuremberg, who created an improved trombone (Neuschel was a talented trombonist himself). In 1500, an elaborated lathe (Drehbank) was created for the emperor's personal carpentry hobby. This is the earliest extant lathe, the earliest known surviving lapidary instrument as well as one of the earliest examples of scientific and technological furniture. The earliest surviving screwdriver has also been found attached to one of his suits of armour. Regiomontanus reportedly made an eagle automaton that moved and greeted him when he came to Nuremberg. Augsburg also courted "their" emperor by building the legendary Nachttor or Night Gate (famous for its many secret mechanisms), intended to make his entrance safer if he returned to the city at night, in 1514. The gate was destroyed in 1867, but plans and descriptions remain so recently Ausburg has created a virtual version. He liked to end his festivals with fireworks. In 1506, on the surface of Lake Konstanz, on the occasion of the gathering of the Reichstag, he staged a show of firework (this was the first recorded German firework, inspired by the example of Italian princes), completed with firework music provided by singers and court trumpeters. Machiavelli judged him as extravagant, but these were not fireworks done for pleasure, peaceful celebration or religious purpose as the type often seen in Italy, but a core ritual of Maximilian's court, that demonstrated the link between pyrotechnics and military technology. The show caused a stir (the news about the event was distributed through a Briefzeitung, or "letter newspaper"), leading to fireworks becoming fashionable. In the Baroque era, it would be a common form of self-stylization for monarchs.

A lot of these scientific and artistic instruments and technical marvels came from Nuremberg, by then the great mechanical, metalworking and precision industry centre of German Renaissance. From 1510, Stabius also took up permanent residence there after travelling with the emperor for years. The city's precision industry and its secondary manufacturing industries were connected to the mining industry, that the leading financiers from the neighbouring Augsburg (which had a flourishing printing industry and was also important for the emperor politically) heavily invested into in partnership with princes like Maximilian.

The development in astronomy, astrology, cosmography and cartography as well as a developing economy with demand for training in book-keeping were tied with the change in status and professionalization of mathematical studies (that once stood behind medicine, jurisprudence and theology as the lowest art) in the universities. The leading figure was George Tanstetter (also the emperor's astrologer and physician), who provided his students with reasonably priced books through the collection and publication of works done by Joannes de Muris, Peuerbach and Regiomontanus and others, as well as wrote Viri Mathematici (Lives of Mathematicians), the first historical study of mathematics of Austria (and also a work to consolidate the position of astronomers, astrologers in Maximilian's court, in imitation of Maximilian's genealogical projects that reinforced his imperial titles). The foremost exponent (and one of the founders) of "descriptive geometry" was Albrecht Dürer himself, whose work Melencolia I was a prime representation and inspired a lot of discussions, including its relation or non-relation to Maximilian's status as the most known melancholic of the time, his and his humanists' fear of the influence of the planet Saturn (some say that the engraving was a self-portrayal of Dürer while others think that it was a talisman for Maximilian to counter Saturn), the Triumphal Arch, hieroglyphics and other esoteric developments in his court, respectively etc.

Maximilian continued with the strong tradition of supporting physicians at court, started by his father Frederick III, despite Maximilian himself had little personal use for them (he usually consulted everyone's opinions and then opted for some self-curing folk practices). He kept on his payroll about 23 court physicians, whom he "poached" during his long travels from the courts of his relatives, friends, rivals and urban hosts. An innovative solution was entrusting these physicians with healthcare in the most important cities, for which purpose an allowance and horses were made available to them. Alessandro Benedetti dedicated his Historia Corporis Humani: sive Anatomice (The Account of Human Body: or Anatomy) to the emperor. As Humanism was established, the Medical Faculty of the University of Vienna increasingly abandoned Scholasticism and focused on studying laws of disease and anatomy based on actual experiences. the early fifteenth century, the Medical Faculty of the university tried to gain influence upon the apothecaries of the city in order to enhance the dispensed medicines' quality and to enforce uniform preparation modes. Finally, in 1517, Maximilian granted them a privilege which allowed the faculty to inspect the Viennese pharmacies and to check the identity, quality and proper storage of the ingredients as well as the formulated preparations. Likely a victim of syphilis (dubbed the "French disease" and used by Maximilian and his humanists like Joseph Grünpeck in their propaganda and artistic works against France) himself, Maximilian had an interest in the disease, which led him to establish eight hospitals in various hereditary lands. He also retained an interest in the healing properties of berries and herbs all his life and invented a recipe for an invigorating stone beer. In Glarus, Switzerland, he is still commemorated for his receipt against plague.

Maximilian had an interest in archaeology, "creative and participatory rather than objective and distancing" (and sometimes destructive), according to Christopher S.Wood. His chief advisor on archaeological matters was Konrad Peutinger, who was also the founder of classical Germanic and Roman studies. Peutinger commenced an ambitious project, the Vitae Imperatorum Augustorum, a series of biographies of emperors from Augustus to Maximilian (each biography would also include epigraphic and numismatic evidences), but only the early sections were completed. The search for medals ultimately led to a broad craze in Germany for medals as an alternative for portraiture. At the suggestion of the emperor, the scholar published his collection of Roman inscriptions. Maximilian did not distinguish between the secular and the sacred, the Middle Ages and antiquity, and considered equal in archaeological value the various searches and excavations of the Holy Tunic (rediscovered in Trier in 1513 after Maximilian demanded to see it, and then exhibited, reportedly attracting 100,000 pilgrims), Roman and German reliefs and inscriptions, etc. and the most famous quest of all, the search for the remains of hero Siegfried. Maximilian's private collection activities were carried out by his secretary, the humanist Johann Fuchsmagen, on his behalf. Sometimes, the emperor came in contact with antiquities during his campaigns – for example, an old German inscription found in Kufstein in 1504, that he immediately sent to Peutinger. Around 1512–1514, Pirckheimer translated and presented Maximilian with Horapollo's Hieroglyphica. The hieroglyphics would be incorporated by Dürer into the Triumphal Arch, which Rudolf Wittkower considers "the greatest hieroglyphic monument".

Maximilian's time was an era of international development for cryptography. His premier expert on cryptography was the Abbot Trithemius, who dedicated Polygraphiae libri sex (controversially disguised as a treatise on occult, either because its real target audience was the selected few such as Maximilian or to attract public attention to a tedious field)  to the emperor and wrote another work on steganography (Steganographia, posthumously published). As practitioner, Maximilian functioned as the Empire's first cipher expert himself. It was under his reign that proven use of encrypted messages in the German chancellery was first recorded, although it was not as elaborate as the mature Italian and Spanish systems. Maximilian experimented with different encryption methods, even in his private correspondence, often based on the Upper Italian models.

In the fields of history and historiography, Trithemius was also a notable forger and inventive historian who helped to connect Maximilian to Trojan heroes, the Merovingians and the Carolingians. The project had contributions from Maximilian's other court historiographers and genealogists such as Ladislaus Suntheim, Johann Stabius, Johannes Cuspinian and Jakob Mennel. While his colleagues like Jakob Mennel and Ladislaus Suntheim often inserted invented ancient ancestors for the missing links, Trithemius invented entire sources, such as Hunibald (supposedly a Scythian historian), Meginfrid and Wastald. The historiographer Josef Grünpeck wrote the work Historia Friderici III et Maximiliani I (which would be dedicated to Charles V). The first history of Germany based on original sources (patronized by Maximilian and cultivated by Peutinger, Aventin, Pirchkheimer, Stabius, Cuspianian and Celtis) was the Epitome Rerum Germanicarum written by Jakob Wimpheling, in which it was argued that the Germans possessed their own flourishing culture.

Maximilian's time was the age of great world chronicles. The most famous and influential is the Nuremberg Chronicle, of which the author, Hartmann Schedel, is usually considered one of the important panegyrists and propagandists, hired and independent, of the emperor and his anti-Ottoman propaganda agenda.

According to Maria Golubeva, Maximilian and his court preferred the fictional settings and reimagination of history (such as the Weisskunig, a "unique mixture of history and heroic romance"), so no outstanding works of historiography (such as those of Molinet and Chastelain at the Burgundian court) were produced. The authors of The Oxford History of Historical Writing: Volume 3: 1400–1800 point out three major distinctives in the historical literature within the imperial circle. The first was genealogical research, which Maximilian elevated to new heights and represented most prominently by the Fürstliche Chronik, written by Jakob Mennel. The second encompassed projects associated with the printing revolution, such as Maximilian's autobiographical projects and Dürer's Triumphal Arch. The third, and also the most sober strain of historical scholarship, constituted "a serious engagement with imperial legacy", with the scholar Johannes Cuspinianus being its most notable representative. Seton-Watson remarks that all his important works show the connection to Maximilian, with the Commentarii de Romanorum Consulibus being "the most profound and critical"; the De Caesaribus et Imperatoribus Romanorum (also considered by Cesc Esteve as his greatest work) possessing the most practical interest, especially regarding Maximilian's life, and the Austria giving a complete history of the nation up to 1519.

He had notable influence on the development of the musical tradition in Austria and Germany as well. Several historians credit Maximilian with playing the decisive role in making Vienna the music capital of Europe. Under his reign, the Habsburg musical culture reached its first high point and he had at his service the best musicians in Europe. He began the Habsburg tradition of supporting large-scale choirs, which he staffed with the brilliant musicians of his days like Paul Hofhaimer, Heinrich Isaac and Ludwig Senfl. His children inherited the parents' passion for music and even in their father's lifetime, supported excellent chapels in Brussels and Mechelen, with masters such as Alexander Agricola, Marbriano de Orto (who worked for Philip), Pierre de La Rue and Josquin Desprez (who worked for Margaret). After witnessing the brilliant Burgundian court culture, he looked to the Burgundian court chapel to create his own imperial chapel. As he was always on the move, he brought the chapel as well as his whole peripatetic court with him. In 1498 though, he established the imperial chapel in Vienna, under the direction of George Slatkonia, who would later become the Bishop of Vienna. Music benefitted greatly through the cross-fertilization between several centres in Burgundy, Italy, Austria and Tyrol (where Maximilian inherited the chapel of his uncle Sigismund).

In the service of Maximilian, Isaac (the first Continental composer who provided music on demand for the monarch-employer) cultivated "the mass-proper genre with an intensity unrivalled anywhere else in Europe". He created a huge cycle of polyphonic Mass Propers, most of which was published posthumously in the collection Choralis Constantinus, printed between 1550 and 1555 – David J. Rothenberg comments that, like many of the other artistic projects commissioned (and instilled with Maximilian's bold artistic vision and imperial ideology), it was never completed. A notable artistic monument, seemingly of great symbolic value to the emperor, was Isaac's motet Virgo prudentissima, which affiliated the reigns of two sovereign monarches – the Virgin Mary of Heaven and Maximilian of the Holy Roman Empire. The motet describes the Assumption of the Virgin, in which Mary, described as the most prudent Virgin (allusion to Parable of the Ten Virgins), "beautiful as the moon", "excellent as the sun" and "glowing brightly as the dawn", was crowned as Queen of Heaven and united with Christ, her bridegroom and son, at the highest place in Heaven. Rothenberg opines that Dürer's Festival of the Rose Garlands (see below) was its "direct visual counterpart". The idea was also reflected in the scene of the Assumption seen in the Berlin Book of hours of Mary of Burgundy and Maximilian (commissioned when Mary of Burgundy was still alive, with some images added posthumously).

Among some authors, Maximilian has a reputation as the "media emperor". The historian Larry Silver describes him as the first ruler who realized and exploited the propaganda potential of the print press both for images and texts. The reproduction of the Triumphal Arch (mentioned above) in printed form is an example of art in service of propaganda, made available for the public by the economical method of printing (Maximilian did not have money to actually construct it). At least 700 copies were created in the first edition and hung in ducal palaces and town halls through the Reich.

Historian Joachim Whaley comments that: "By comparison with the extraordinary range of activities documented by Silver, and the persistence and intensity with which they were pursued, even Louis XIV appears a rather relaxed amateur." Whaley notes, though, that Maximilian had an immediate stimulus for his "campaign of self-aggrandizement through public relation": the series of conflicts that involved Maximilian forced him to seek means to secure his position. Whaley further suggests that, despite the later religious divide, "patriotic motifs developed during Maximilian's reign, both by Maximilian himself and by the humanist writers who responded to him, formed the core of a national political culture."

Historian Manfred Hollegger notes though that the emperor's contemporaries certainly did not see Maximilian as a "media emperor": "He achieved little political impact with pamphlets, leaflets and printed speeches. Nevertheless, it is certainly true that he combined brilliantly all the media available at that time for his major literary and artistic projects". Tupu Ylä-Anttila notes that while his daughter (to whom Maximilian entrusted a lot of his diplomacy) often maintained a sober tone and kept a competent staff of advisors who helped her with her letters, her father did not demonstrate such an effort and occasionally sent emotional and erratic letters (the letters of Maximilian and Margaret were often presented to foreign diplomats to prove their trust in each other). Maria Golubeva opines that with Maximilian, one should use the term "propaganda" in the sense suggested by Karl Vocelka: "opinion-making". Also, according to Golubeva, unlike the narrative usually presented by Austrian historians including Wiesflecker, Maximilian's "propaganda", that was associated with 'militarism', universal imperial claims and court historiography, with a tendency towards world domination, was not the simple result of his Burgundian experience – his 'model of political competition' (as shown in his semi-autobiographical works), while equally secular, ignored the negotiable and institutional aspects inherent in the Burgundian model and, at the same time, emphasized top-down decision making and military force.

During Maximilian's reign, with encouragement from the emperor and his humanists, iconic spiritual figures were reintroduced or became notable. The humanists rediscovered the work Germania, written by Tacitus. According to Peter H. Wilson, the female figure of Germania was reinvented by the emperor as the virtuous pacific Mother of Holy Roman Empire of the German Nation. Inheriting the work of Klosterneuburg canons and his father Frederick III, he promoted Leopold III, Margrave of Austria (who had family ties to the emperor), who was canonized in 1485 and became the Patron of Austria in 1506. To maximize the effect that consolidated his rule, the emperor delayed the translation of Leopold's bones for years until he could personally be there.

He promoted the association between his own wife Mary of Burgundy and the Virgin Mary, that had already been started in her lifetime by members of the Burgundian court before his arrival. These activities included the patronage (by Maximilian, Philip the Fair and Charles V) of the devotion of the Seven Sorrows as well as the commission (by Maximilian and his close associates) of various artworks dedicating to the topic such as the famous paintings Feast of the Rosary (1506) and Death of the Virgin (1518, one year before the emperor's death) by Albrecht Dürer, the famous diptych of Maximilian's extended family (after 1515) by Strigel, the Manuscript VatS 160 by the composer Pierre Alamire.

Maximilian's reign witnessed the gradual emergence of the German common language. His chancery played a notable role in developing new linguistic standards. Martin Luther credited Maximilian and the Wettin Elector Frederick the Wise with the unification of German language. Tennant and Johnson opine that while other chanceries have been considered significant and then receded in important when the research direction changes, the chanceries of these two rulers have always been considered important from the beginning. As a part of his  influential literary and propaganda projects, Maximilian had his autobiographical works embellished, reworked and sometimes ghostwritten in the chancery itself. He is also credited with a major reform of the imperial chancery office: "Maximilian is said to have caused a standardization and streamlining in the language of his Chancery, which set the pace for chanceries and printers throughout the Empire." The form of written German language he introduced into his chancery was called Maximilian's Chancery Speech (Maximilianische Kanzleisprache) and considered a form of Early New High German. It replaced older forms of written language that were close to Middle High German. This new form was used by the imperial chanceries until the end of the 17th century and therefore also referred to as the Imperial speech.

Architecture

Never having that much money, Maximilian could not afford large scale building projects. However, he left a few notable constructions, among which the most remarkable is the cenotaph (designed by Maximilian) he began in the Hofkirche, Innsbruck, which was completed long after his death, and has been praised as the most important monument of Renaissance Austria and considered the "culmination of Burgundian tomb tradition" (especially for the groups of statues of family members) that displayed Late Gothic features, combined with Renaissance traditions like reliefs and busts of Roman emperors. The monument was vastly expanded under his grandson Ferdinand I, who added the tumba, the portal, and on the advice of his Vice Chancellor Georg Sigmund Seld, commissioned the 24 marble reliefs based on the images on the Triumphal Arch. The work was only finished under Archduke Ferdinand II (1529–1595). The reliefs were carved by the Flemish sculptor Alexander Colyn while the statues were cast by the bronze-founder Stefan Godl following the designs of Gilg Sesshelschreiber and Jörg Kölderer. The bronze busts of Roman emperors were created by Jörg Muskat.

After taking Tyrol, in order to symbolize his new wealth and power, he built the Golden Roof, the roof for a balcony overlooking the town center of Innsbruck, from which to watch the festivities celebrating his assumption of rule over Tyrol. The roof is made with gold-plated copper tiles. The structure was a symbol of the presence of the ruler, even when he was physically absent. It began the vogue of using reliefs to decorate oriel windows. The Golden Roof is also considered one of the most notable Habsburg monuments. Like Maximilian's cenotaph, it is in an essentially Gothic idiom. The structure was built by Niclas Türing (Nikolaus Turing) while the paintings was done by Jörg Kölderer.

The Innsbruck Hofburg was redesigned and expanded, chiefly under Niclas Türing. By the time Maximilian died in 1519, the palace was one of the most beautiful and renowned secular structures of the era (but would be rebuilt later in the Baroque style by Maria Theresa).

The famous sculpture Schutzmantelmadonna (Virgin of Mercy), donated in 1510 by Maximilian to the Frauenstein Pilgrimage Church in Molln, was a work by Gregor Erhart.

From 1498 onwards, Maximilian caused many castles and palaces in Vienna, Graz, Wiener Neustadt, Innsbruck and Linz to be renovated and modernized. Not only the facade was redesigned and glazed bricks were integrated, Maximilian also paid special attention to the sanitation aspect, issuing precise instructions concerning the "secret chamber", the deflection of waste into a cesspit through pipes and the purification of smells through the use of "herbal essences". In many towns, he caused streets and alleys to be cobbled and added gutters for rain water. He issued regulations that ordered open drains for waste water to be bricked up and forbade the keeping of animals in the towns. It was also ordained that no rubbish was allowed in the streets overnight. Directions related to fire prevention were also issued, leading to fire walls being constructed between the houses and tiled roofs in many towns. In the hereditary lands and Southern Germany, through his financial blessings, there were wooden cities that were transformed into stone ones.

Modern postal system and printing

Together with Franz von Taxis, in 1490, Maximilian developed the first modern postal service in the world. The system was originally built to improve communication between his scattered territories, connecting Burgundy, Austria, Spain and France and later developing to a Europe-wide, fee-based system. Fixed postal routes (the first in Europe) were developed, together with regular and reliable service. From the beginning of the sixteenth century, the system became open to private mail. The initiative was immediately emulated by France and England, although rulers there restricted the spread of private mails and private postal networks. Systematic improvement allowed communication to reach Maximilian, wherever he was, twice as fast as normal, to the point Wolfgang Behringer remarks that "perception of temporal and spatial dimensions was changed". The new development, usually described as the communication revolution, could largely be traced back to Maximilian's initiative, with contributions from Frederick III and Charles the Bold in developing the messenger networks, the Italian courier model and possibly influence from the French model.

The establishment of the postal network also signaled the beginning of a commercial market for news, together with the emergence of commercial newsagents and news agencies, which the emperor actively encouraged. According to Michael Kunczik, he was the first to utilize one-sided battle reports targeting the mass, including the use of the early predecessors of modern newspapers (neue zeitungen).

The capital resources he poured into the postage system as well as support for the related printing press (when Archduke, he opened a school for sophisticated engraving techniques) were on a level unprecedented by European monarches, and earned him stern rebuke from the father.

His patronage drew to Augsburg printmakers from the Netherlands (especially from Antwerp) like Jost de Negker and the brothers Cornelis I (died 1528) and Willem Liefrinck, who came there as teens. After his death, as teams dispersed, Negker remained in Augsburg while the Liefrincks returned to their homeland, established there a printmaking dynasty and introduced German-styled workshops. According to Printing Colour 1400–1700: History, Techniques, Functions and Receptions, there was a dramatic drop in both quantity and quality of print projects in Augsburg as a whole once Charles V took over.

The development of the printing press led to a search for a national font. In 1508 or 1510, Maximilian (possibly with Dürer's advice) commissioned the calligrapher Leonhard Wagner to create a new font. Wagner dedicated his calligraphy work Proba centum scripturatum (including one hundred fonts) to Maximilian, who chose the Schwabacher-based font Fraktur, deemed the most beautiful one. While he originally envisioned this font for Latin works, it became the predominant font for German writings, while German printers would use Antiqua for works written in foreign languages. The font would spread to German-influenced countries and remain popular in Germany until being banned in 1941 by the Nazi government as a "Jewish" font. Burgkmair was the chief designer for most of his printing projects. Augsburg was the great center of the printing industry, where the emperor patronized printing and other types of craft through the agency of Conrad Peutinger, giving impetus for the formation of an "imperial" style. Burgkmair and Erhard Ratdolt created new printing techniques. As for his own works, as he wanted to produce the appearance of luxury manuscripts, he mixed handcrafted elements with printing: his Book of Prayers and Theuerdank (Weisskunig and Freydal were unfinished before the emperor's death) were printed with a type that resembled calligraphy (the Imperial Fraktur created by Johannes Schönperger). For prestigious recipients, he used parchment rather than paper. At least one copy of the Book of Hours was decorated by hand by Burgkmair, Dürer, Hans Baldung, Jörg Breu and Cranach.

Political legacy
Maximilian had appointed his daughter Margaret as the Regent of the Netherlands, and she fulfilled this task well. Tupu Ylä-Anttila opines that Margaret acted as de facto queen consort in a political sense, first to her father and then Charles V, "absent rulers" who needed a representative dynastic presence that also complemented their characteristics. Her queenly virtues helped her to play the role of diplomat and peace-maker, as well as guardian and educator of future rulers, whom Maximilian called "our children" or "our common children" in letters to Margaret. This was a model that developed as part of the solution for the emerging Habsburg composite monarchy and would continue to serve later generations.

Through wars and marriages he extended the Habsburg influence in every direction: to the Netherlands, Spain, Bohemia, Hungary, Poland, and Italy. This influence lasted for centuries and shaped much of European history. The Habsburg Empire survived as the Austro-Hungarian Empire until it was dissolved 3 November 1918 – 399 years 11 months and 9 days after the passing of Maximilian.

Geoffrey Parker summarizes Maximilian's political legacy as follows:

By the time Charles received his presentation copy of Der Weisskunig in 1517, Maximilian could point to four major successes. He had protected and reorganized the Burgundian Netherlands, Whose political future had seemed bleak when he became their ruler forty years earlier. Likewise, he had overcome the obstacles posed by individual institutions, traditions and languages to forge the sub-Alpine lands he inherited from his father into a single state: ‘Austria’, ruled and taxed by a single administration that he created at Innsbruck. He had also reformed the chaotic central government of the Holy Roman Empire in ways that, though imperfect, would last almost until its demise three centuries later. Finally, by arranging strategic marriages for his grandchildren, he had established the House of Habsburg as the premier dynasty in central and eastern Europe, creating a polity that his successors would expand over the next four centuries.
The Britannica Encyclopaedia comments on Maximilian's achievements:
Maximilian I [...] made his family, the Habsburgs, dominant in 16th-century Europe. He added vast lands to the traditional Austrian holdings, securing the Netherlands by his own marriage, Hungary and Bohemia by treaty and military pressure, and Spain and the Spanish empire by the marriage of his son Philip [...] Great as Maximilian's achievements were, they did not match his ambitions; he had hoped to unite all of western Europe by reviving the empire of Charlemagne [...] His military talents were considerable and led him to use war to attain his ends. He carried out meaningful administrative reforms, and his military innovations would transform Europe's battlefields for more than a century, but he was ignorant of economics and was financially unreliable.

Hollegger notes that, as Maximilian could not persuade his imperial estates to support his plans, he cultivated a system of alliances, in which the germ of modern European powers could be seen – like in the game of chess, no piece could be moved without thinking ahead about the others.

According to Cauchies, it was after the fifteen struggling years of Mary and Maximilian's joint rule and then of Maximilian's sole rule, the state building project first envisioned by the Burgundian dukes showed concrete results: "a consortium of territories nevertheless emerged which found its place in the West under the heirs, Philip the Handsome and Charles V.". Nevertheless, even though an innovative leader of stature, Maximilian's zealous anti-French sentiments (to which, even the Senlis Treaty was a failure), his project of imperial universality and his Habsburg heritage tended to make him out of touch with the Burgundian perspective, as displayed by his son Philip, a peace-loving monarch, and his court (although in his mind, Maximilian probably imagined himself as the true defender of the Low Countries, that inexplicably always rejected him so much). Haemers notes that, for the Dutch, it is impossible to celebrate him the way Germans or Austrians do, even if that is about the troubled feelings Maximilian left and national pride, rather than true reflection of the past.

Hugh Trevor-Roper opines that, although Maximilian's politics and wars accomplished little, "By harnessing the arts, he surrounded his dynasty with a lustrous aura it had previously lacked. It was to this illusion that his successors looked for their inspiration. To them, he was not simply the second founder of the dynasty; he was the creator of its legend – one that transcended politics, nationality, even religion." Paula Sutter Fichtner opines that Maximilian was the author of a "basic but imperfect script for the organization of a Habsburg government now charged with administering a territorial complex that extended far beyond the dynasty's medieval patrimony in central Europe." – He used his revenues profligately for wars. Although aware of the dangers of over-extended credit, in order to protect his borders, imperial prerogatives and advance Habsburg interests, all of which he considered seriously, he could not internalize fiscal discipline. The role of the emperor in the government was very personalized – only when Maximilian's health failed him badly in 1518 did he set up a Hofrat including 18 jurists and nobles from the Empire and Austrian lands to assist him with the responsibilities he was incapable of handling anymore. The alliance between crown and cities for which he laid the foundation never culminated in a southern centralized Habsburg monarchy: the rise of the common man in the crucial years of mid-1250s forced Imperial Cities in Upper Germany to master the Reformation in a way that estranged them from the emperor – a situation which Charles V and Ferdinand were too busy with non-German affairs to manage.

Maximilian's life is still commemorated in Central Europe centuries later. The Order of St. George, which he sponsored, still exists. In 2011, for example, a monument was erected for him in Cortina d’Ampezzo. Also in 1981 in Cormons on the Piazza della Libertà a statue of Maximilian, which was there until the First World War, was put up again. On the occasion of the 500th anniversary of his death there were numerous commemorative events in 2019 at which Karl von Habsburg, the current head of the House of Habsburg, represented the imperial dynasty. A barracks in Wiener Neustadt, Maximilian-Kaserne (formerly Artilleriekaserne), a military base for the Jagdkommando of the Austrian Armed Forces, was named after Maximilian.

Amsterdam still retains close ties with the emperor. His 1484 pilgrimage to Amsterdam boosted the popularity of the  Heilige Stede and the city's "miracle industry" to new heights. The city supported him financially in his military expeditions, he granted its citizens the right to use the image of his crown, which remains a symbol of the city as part of its coat-of-arms. The practice survived the later revolt against Habsburg Spain. The central canal in Amsterdam was named in 1615 as the Keizersgracht (Emperor's Canal) after Maximilian. The city beer (Brugse Zot, or The Fools of Bruges) of Bruges, which suffered a four century long decline that was partially inflicted by Maximilian's orders (that required foreign merchants to transfer operations to Antwerp – later he would withdraw the orders but it proved too late.), is associated with the emperor, who according to legend told the city in a conciliatory celebration that they did not need to build an asylum, as the city was full of fools. The swans of the city are considered a perpetual remembrance (allegedly ordered by Maximilian) for Lanchals (whose name meant "long necks" and whose emblem was a swan), the loyalist minister who got beheaded while Maximilian was forced to watch. In Mechelen, Burgundian capital under Margaret of Austria, every 25 years, an ommegang that commemorates Maximilian's arrival as well as other major events is organized.

Ancestry

Official styleWe, Maximilian, by the Grace of God, elected Roman Emperor, always Augmenter of the Empire, King of Hungary, Dalmatia, Croatia, etc. Archduke of Austria, Duke of Burgundy, Britany, Lorrain, Brabant, Stiria, Carinthia, Carniola, Limbourg, Luxembourg, and Guldres; Count of Flanders, Habsburg, Tyrol, Pfiert, Kybourg, Artois, and Burgundy; Count Palatine of Haynault, Holland, Zeland, Namur, and Zutphen; Marquess of the Roman Empire and of Burgau, Landgrave of Alsatia, Lord of Friesland, the Wendish Mark, Portenau, Salins, and Malines, etc. etc.Chivalric orders

On 30 April 1478, Maximilian was knighted by Adolf of Cleves (1425–1492), a senior member of the Order of the Golden Fleece and on the same day he became the sovereign of this exalted order. As its head, he did everything in his power to restore its glory as well as associate the order with the Habsburg lineage. He expelled the members who had defected to France and rewarded those loyal to him, and also invited foreign rulers to join its ranks.

Maximilian I was a member of the Order of the Garter, nominated by King Henry VII of England in 1489. His Garter stall plate survives in St George's Chapel, Windsor Castle.

Maximilian was patron of the Order of Saint George founded by his father, and also the founder of its secular confraternity.

Appearance and personality

Maximilian was strongly built with an upright posture (he was over six feet tall), had blue eyes, neck length blond or reddish hair, a large hooked nose and a jutting jaw (like his father, he always shaved his beard, as the jutting jaw was considered a noble feature).  Although not conventionally handsome, he was well-proportioned and considered physically attractive, with abiding youthfulness and an affable, pleasing manner. A womanizer since his teenager days, he increasingly sought distraction from the tragedy of the first marriage and the frustration of the second marriage in the company of "sleeping women" in all corners of his empire. Sigrid-Maria Grössing describes him as a charming heartbreaker for all his life. He could manoeuvre with one hand a seven-meter lance comfortably.

Maximilian was a late developer. According to his teacher Johannes Cuspinian, he did not speak until he was nine-year-old, and after that only developed slowly. Frederick III recalled that when his son was twelve, he still thought that the boy was either mute or stupid. In his adulthood, he spoke six languages (he learned French from his wife Mary) and was a genuinely talented author. Other than languages, mathematics and religion, he painted and played various instruments and was also trained in farming, carpentry and blacksmithing, although the focus of his education was naturally kingship. According to Fichtner, he did not learn much from formal training though, because even as a boy, he never sat still and tutors could not do much about that. Gerhard Benecke opines that by nature he was the man of action, a "vigorously charming extrovert" who had a "conventionally superficial interest in knowledge, science and art combined with excellent health in his youth" (he remained virile into his late thirties and only stopped jousting after an accident damaged a leg). He was brave to the point of recklessness, and this did not only show in battles. He once entered a lion's enclosure in Munich alone to tease the lion, and at another point climbed to the top of the Cathedral of Ulm, stood on one foot and turned himself round to gain a full view, at the trepidation of his attendants. In the nineteenth century, an Austrian officer lost his life trying to repeat the emperor's "feat", while another succeeded. While he paid magnificently for a princely style, he required little for personal needs. In his mature years, he exerted restraint on personal habits, except during his depressive phases (when he drank night and day, sometimes incapacitating the government, to the great annoyance of Chancellor  Zyprian von Sernteiner) or in the companion of his artist friends. The artists got preferential treatment in criminal matters too, such as the case of Veit Stoss, whose sentence (imprisonment and having his hands chopped off for an actual crime) issued by Nuremberg got cancelled on the sole basis of genius. The emperor's reasoning was that, what came as a gift from God should not be treated according to usual norms or human proportions. To the astonishment of contemporaries, he laughed at the satire directed against his person and organized celebrations after defeats.

Historian Ernst Bock, with whom Benecke shares the same sentiment, writes the following about him:
His rosy optimism and utilitarianism, his totally naive amorality in matters political, both unscrupulous and machiavellian; his sensuous and earthy naturalness, his exceptional receptiveness towards anything beautiful especially in the visual arts, but also towards the various fashions of his time whether the nationalism in politics, the humanism in literature and philosophy or in matters of economics and capitalism; further his surprising yearning for personal fame combined with a striving for popularity, above all the clear consciousness of a developed individuality: these properties Maximilian displayed again and again.

Historian Paula Fichtner describes Maximilian as a leader who was ambitious and imaginative to a fault, with self-publicizing tendencies as well as  territorial and administrative ambitions that betrayed a nature both "soaring and recognizably modern", while dismissing Benecke's presentation of Maximilian as "an insensitive agent of exploitation" as influenced by the author's personal political leaning.

Berenger and Simpson consider Maximilian a greedy Renaissance prince, and also, "a prodigious man of action whose chief fault was to have 'too many irons in the fire'". On the other hand, Steven Beller criticizes him for being too much of a medieval knight who had a hectic schedule of warring, always crisscrossing the whole continent to do battles (for example, in August 1513, he commanded Henry VIII's English army in the second Guinegate, and a few weeks later joined the Spanish forces in defeating the Venetians) with little resources to support his ambitions. According to Beller, Maximilian should have spent more time at home persuading the estates to adopt a more efficient governmental and fiscal system.

Thomas A. Brady Jr. praises the emperor's sense of honour, but criticizes his financial immorality – according to Geoffrey Parker, both points, together with Maximilian's martial qualities and hard-working nature, would be inherited from the grandfather by Charles V:
[...]though punctilious to a fault about his honor, he lacked all morals about money. Every florin was spent, mortgaged, and promised ten times over before it ever came in; he set his courtiers a model for their infamous venality; he sometimes had to leave his queen behind as pledge for his debts; and he borrowed continuously from his servitors – large sums from top officials, tiny ones from servants – and never repaid them. Those who liked him tried to make excuses.

Certain English sources describe him as a ruler who habitually failed to keep his words. According to Wiesflecker, people could often depend on his promises more than those of most princes of his days, although he was no stranger to the "clausola francese" and also tended to use a wide variety of statements to cover his true intentions, which unjustly earned him the reputation of being fickle. Hollegger concurs that Maximilian's court officials, except Eitelfriedrich von Zollern and Wolfgang von Fürstenberg, did expect gifts and money for tips and help, and the emperor usually defended his counselors and servants even if he acted against the more blatant displays of material greed. Maximilian though was not a man who could be controlled or influenced easily by his officials. Hollegger also opines that while many of his political and artistic schemes leaned towards megalomania, there was a sober realist who believed in progression and relied on modern modes of management underneath. Personally, "frequently described as humane, gentle, and friendly, he reacted with anger, violence, and vengefulness when he felt his rights had been injured or his honor threatened, both of which he valued greatly." The price for his warlike ruling style and his ambition for a globalized monarchy (that ultimately achieved considerable successes) was a continuous succession of war, that earned him the sobriquet "Heart of steel" (Coeur d’acier).

Marriages and offspring

Maximilian was married three times, but only the first marriage produced offspring:
 Maximilian's first wife was Mary of Burgundy (1457–1482). They were married in Ghent on 19 August 1477, and the marriage was ended by Mary's death in a riding accident in 1482. Mary was the love of his life. Even in old age, the mere mention of her name moved him to tears (although, his sexual life, contrary to his chivalric ideals, was unchaste). The grand literary projects commissioned and composed in large part by Maximilian many years after her death were in part tributes to their love, especially Theuerdank, in which the hero saved the damsel in distress like he had saved her inheritance in real life. His heart is buried inside her sarcophagus in Bruges according to his wish. Beyond her beauty, the inheritance and the glory she brought, Mary corresponded to Maximilian's ideal of a woman: the spirited grand "Dame" who could stand next to him as sovereigns. To their daughter Margaret, he described Mary: from her eyes shone the power (Kraft) that surpassed any other woman.

The marriage produced three children:
 Philip I of Castile (1478–1506) who inherited his mother's domains following her death, but predeceased his father. He married Joanna of Castile, becoming king-consort of Castile upon her accession in 1504, and was the father of the Holy Roman Emperors Charles V and Ferdinand I.
 Margaret of Austria (1480–1530), who was first engaged at the age of 2 to the French dauphin (who became Charles VIII of France a year later) to confirm peace between France and Burgundy. She was sent back to her father in 1492 after Charles repudiated their betrothal to marry Anne of Brittany. She was then married to the crown prince of Castile and Aragon John, Prince of Asturias, and after his death to Philibert II of Savoy, after which she undertook the guardianship of her deceased brother Philip's children, and governed Burgundy for the heir, Charles.
 Francis of Austria, who died shortly after his birth in 1481.
 Maximilian's second wife was Anne of Brittany (1477–1514) – they were married by proxy in Rennes on 18 December 1490, but the contract was dissolved by the pope in early 1492, by which time Anne had already been forced by the French king, Charles VIII (the fiancé of Maximilian's daughter Margaret of Austria) to repudiate the contract and marry him instead.

The drive behind this marriage, to the great annoyance of Frederick III (who characterized it as "disgraceful"), was the desire of personal revenge against the French (Maximilian blamed France for the great tragedies of his life up to and including Mary of Burgundy's death, political upheavals that followed, troubles in the relationship with his son and later, Philip's death ). The young King of the Romans had in mind a pincer grip against the Kingdom of France, while Frederick wanted him to focus on expansion towards the East and maintenance of stability in newly reacquired Austria. But Brittany was so weak that it could not resist French advance by itself even briefly like the Burgundian State had done, while Maximilian could not even personally come to Brittany to consummate the marriage.
 Maximilian's third wife was Bianca Maria Sforza (1472–1510) – they were married in 1493, the marriage bringing Maximilian a rich dowry and allowing him to assert his rights as imperial overlord of Milan. The marriage was unhappy, and they had no children. In Maximilian's view, while Bianca might surpass his first wife Mary in physical beauty, she was just a "child" with "a mediocre mind", who could neither make decisions nor be presented as a respectable lady to the society. Benecke opines that this seems unfair, as while Bianca was always concerned with trivial, private matters (Recent research though indicates that Bianca was an educated woman who was politically active), she was never given the chance to develop politically, unlike the other women in Maximilian's family including Margaret of Austria or Catherine of Saxony. Despite her unsuitability as an empress, Maximilian tends to be criticized for treating her with coldness and neglect, which after 1500 only became worse. Bianca, on the other hand, loved the emperor deeply and always tried to win his heart with heartfelt letters, expensive jewels and allusions to sickness, but did not even get back a letter, developed eating disorders and mental illness, and died a childless woman.  Joseph Grünpeck, the court historian and physician, criticized the emperor, who, in Grünpeck's opinion, was responsible for Bianca's death through neglect.

In addition, he had several illegitimate children, but the number and identities of those are a matter of great debate. Johann Jakob Fugger writes in Ehrenspiegel (Mirror of Honour'') that the emperor began fathering illegitimate children after becoming a widower, and there were eight children in total, four boys and four girls.
 By a widow in Den Bosch, whom Maximilian met in a campaign:
 Barbara Disquis (1482–1568): Her birth and Mary of Burgundy's death seemed to connect to Maximilian's near fatal illness in 1482 and later pilgrimage to Amsterdam in 1484. In her teenage years, she rebelled against her father and entered St Gertrude's convent.  Philip the Fair was introduced to her in 1504 when he and Maximilian went to Den Bosch to preparing for the war against Guelders. Philip tried to persuade her to leave the convent and get married on their father's behalf, but she refused. The place she was buried was now a square named after her. In 2021, a recently built city walk has been named "Mijn lieven dochter" ("My dear daughter") and also close to Maximilian's statue.
 By unknown mistress:
 Martha von Helfenstein or Margaretha, Mathilde, Margareta, née von Edelsheim (?–1537), wife of Johann von Hille (died 1515), remarried Ludwig Helferich von Helfenstein (1493–1525, married in 1517 or 1520); Ludwig was killed by peasants on 16 April 1525 in the Massacre of Weinsberg during the German Peasants' War. They had a surviving son named Maximilian (1523–1555) Some sources reported that she was born in 1480 or her mother was Margareta von Edelsheim, née Rappach.
 By Margareta von Edelsheim, née Rappach (?–1522) Dingel reports that she was born around 1470 while others report that in 1494 she was still a minor when she married von Rottal:
 Barbara von Rottal (1500–1550), wife of Siegmund von Dietrichstein. Some report that she was the daughter of Margareta von Edelsheim, née Rappach, while Benecke lists the mother as unidentified.
 George of Austria (1505–1557), Prince-Bishop of Liège.
 By Anna von Helfenstein:
 Cornelius (1507–).
 Maximilian Friedrich von Amberg (1511–1553), Lord of Feldkirch.
 Anna Maria (1512–1562) wife of Bartold Dienger 
 Leopold, bishop of Córdoba, Spain (1541–1557), with illegitimate succession.
 Dorothea (1516–1572), heiress of Falkenburg, Durbuy and Halem, lady in waiting to Queen Maria of Hungary; wife of Johan I of East Frisia.
 Anna Margareta (1517–1545), lady in waiting to Queen Maria of Hungary; wife of François de Melun (?–1547), 2nd count of Epinoy. 
 Anne (1519–?). She married Louis d'Hirlemont.
 Elisabeth (d. 1581–1584), wife of Ludwig III von der Marck, Count of Rochefort.
 Barbara, wife of Wolfgang Plaiss.
 Christoph Ferdinand ( ).
 By unknown mistress (parentage uncertain):
 Guielma, wife of Rudiger (Rieger) von Westernach.

Triumphal woodcuts
A set of woodcuts called the Triumph of Emperor Maximilian I. See also Category:Triumphal Procession of Maximilian I – Wikimedia Commons

In arts and popular culture

See also
 Family tree of the German monarchs. He was related to every other king of Germany.
 First Congress of Vienna – The First Congress of Vienna was held in 1515, attended by the Holy Roman Emperor, Maximilian I, and the Jagiellonian brothers, Vladislaus II, King of Hungary and King of Bohemia, and Sigismund I, King of Poland and Grand Duke of Lithuania
 Landsknecht – The German Landsknechts, sometimes also rendered as Landsknechte were colorful mercenary soldiers with a formidable reputation, who became an important military force through late 15th- and 16th-century Europe

Notes

References

Works

Bibliography

 
 
 

 
 
 
 
 
 
 
 
 

 
 
 
 
 

 

 
 

 
 
 
 

 
 
 
 
 
 
 

 

 
 
 
 
 

 
 

 
 

 
 
 
 
 

 

 
 
 
 
 
 
 

 
 

 

 
 
 
 
 
 
  In 5 volumes.

Further reading

 
 
 
 
 
 
 
 
 
 
 
 
 
 
 
 
 López Poza, Sagrario, "The Devices of Emperor Maximilian I of Austria" The Devices of Emperor Maximilian I of Austria. In Spanish: "Divisas del emperador Maximiliano I de Austria", Janus 10 (2021), pp. 319–349.

External links

 Austria Family Tree
 AEIOU Encyclopedia | Maximilian I
 

 
1459 births
1519 deaths
15th-century Holy Roman Emperors
16th-century Holy Roman Emperors
15th-century archdukes of Austria
16th-century archdukes of Austria
House of Valois
Rulers of the Habsburg Netherlands
Dukes of Styria
Dukes of Carinthia
Counts of Tyrol
Knights of the Garter
Knights of the Golden Fleece
Maximilian
Pretenders to the Hungarian throne
People from Wiener Neustadt
Grand Masters of the Order of the Golden Fleece
Jure uxoris officeholders
Burials in Wiener Neustadt, Austria
15th-century peers of France
Sons of kings
Dukes of Carniola